From July 30, 2015 to March 20, 2016, the following skiing events took place at various locations around the world.

Alpine skiing

2016 Winter Youth Olympics (FIS) and World Championships
 February 13 – 20: 2016 Winter Youth Olympics in  Lillehammer
 Boy's Slalom winners:   Manuel Traninger;   Filip Vennerstroem;   Odin Vassbotn Breivik
 Boy's Giant Slalom winners:   River Radamus;   Yohei Koyama;   Anton Grammel
 Boy's Super G winners:   River Radamus;   Pietro Canzio;   Manuel Traninger
 Men's Alpine Combined winners:   River Radamus;   Manuel Traninger;   Pietro Canzio
 Girl's Slalom winners:   Aline Danioth;   Ali Nullmeyer;   Meta Hrovat
 Girl's Giant Slalom winners:   Mélanie Meillard;   Katrin Hirtl-Stanggassinger;   Aline Danioth
 Girl's Super G winners:   Nadine Fest;   Julia Scheib;   Aline Danioth
 Girl's Alpine Combined winners:   Aline Danioth;   Mélanie Meillard;   Kathrin Hirtl-Stanggassinger
 Parallel Mixed Team winners:  ;  ;  
 February 25 – March 5: 2016 FIS Alpine Junior World Ski Championships in  Sochi
 Men's Downhill winner:  Erik Arvidsson
 Women's Downhill winner:  Valérie Grenier
 Men's Super G winner:  Matthieu Bailet
 Women's Super G winner:  Nina Ortlieb
 Men's Alpine Combined winner:  Stefan Hadalin
 Women's Alpine Combined winner:  Aline Danioth
 Men's Giant Slalom winner:  Marco Odermatt
 Women's Giant Slalom winner:  Jasmina Suter
 Men's Slalom winner:  Istok Rodes
 Women's Slalom winner:  Elisabeth Willibald
 Team winners:

2016 Alpine Skiing World Cup
 October
 October 24 & 25, 2015: FIS AS World Cup #1 in  Sölden
 Men's Giant Slalom winner:  Ted Ligety
 Women's Giant Slalom winner:  Federica Brignone
 November
 November 14 & 15, 2015: FIS AS World Cup #2 in  Levi, Kittilä
 Event cancelled, due to lack of snow and unfavorable weather conditions.
 November 25 – 29, 2015: FIS AS World Cup #3 in  Lake Louise Ski Resort #1
 Men's Downhill winner:  Aksel Lund Svindal
 Men's Super G winner:  Aksel Lund Svindal
 November 28 & 29, 2015: FIS AS World Cup #4 in  Aspen, Colorado
 Women's Giant Slalom winner:  Lara Gut
 Women's Slalom winner #1:  Mikaela Shiffrin
 Women's Slalom winner #2:  Mikaela Shiffrin
 December
 December 1 – 6, 2015: FIS AS World Cup #5 in  Lake Louise Ski Resort #2
 Women's Downhill #1 winner:  Lindsey Vonn
 Women's Downhill #2 winner:  Lindsey Vonn
 Women's Super G winner:  Lindsey Vonn
 December 1 – 6, 2015: FIS AS World Cup #6 in  Beaver Creek Resort, Avon, Colorado
 Men's Downhill winner:  Aksel Lund Svindal
 Men's Super G winner:  Marcel Hirscher
 Men's Giant Slalom winner:  Marcel Hirscher
 December 12 & 13, 2015: FIS AS World Cup #7 in  Val-d'Isère #1
 Men's Slalom winner:  Henrik Kristoffersen
 Men's Giant Slalom winner:  Marcel Hirscher
 December 12 & 13, 2015: FIS AS World Cup #8 in  Åre Ski Area, Jämtland
 Women's Slalom winner:  Petra Vlhová
 Women's Giant Slalom winner:  Lindsey Vonn
 December 16 – 19, 2015: FIS AS World Cup #9 in  Val Gardena
 Men's Super G winner:  Aksel Lund Svindal
 Men's Downhill winner:  Aksel Lund Svindal
 December 16 – 19, 2015: FIS AS World Cup #10 in  Val-d'Isère #2
 Women's Alpine Combined winner:  Lara Gut
 Women's Combined Disciplines Downhill winner:  Lindsey Vonn
 Women's Downhill winner:  Lara Gut
 December 20, 2015: FIS AS World Cup #11 in  Courchevel
 Women's Giant Slalom winner:  Eva-Maria Brem
 December 20 & 21, 2015: FIS AS World Cup #12 in  Alta Badia
 Men's Giant Slalom winner:  Marcel Hirscher
 Men's Parallel Giant Slalom winner:  Kjetil Jansrud
 December 22, 2015: FIS AS World Cup #13 in  Madonna di Campiglio
 Men's Slalom winner:  Henrik Kristoffersen
 December 27 – 29, 2015: FIS AS World Cup #14 in  Santa Caterina di Valfurva #1
 Men's Downhill winner:  Adrien Théaux
 December 28 & 29, 2015: FIS AS World Cup #15 in  Lienz
 Women's Giant Slalom winner:  Lara Gut
 Women's Slalom winner:  Frida Hansdotter
 January
 January 1: FIS AS World Cup #16 in  Munich
 Events cancelled.
 January 5 & 6: FIS AS World Cup #17 in  Santa Caterina di Valfurva #2
 Men's Slalom winner:  Marcel Hirscher
 Women's Slalom winner:  Nina Løseth
 January 7 – 10: FIS AS World Cup #18 in  Altenmarkt–Zauchensee
 Women's Downhill winner:  Lindsey Vonn
 Women's Super G winner:  Lindsey Vonn
 January 9 & 10: FIS AS World Cup #19 in  Adelboden
 Note: The Men's Giant Slalom event here was cancelled.
 Men's Slalom winner:  Henrik Kristoffersen
 Men's Downhill winner:  Aksel Lund Svindal
 January 12: FIS AS World Cup #20 in  Flachau #1
 Women's Slalom winner:  Veronika Velez-Zuzulová
 January 12 – 17: FIS AS World Cup #21 in  Wengen
 Men's Alpine Combined winner:  Kjetil Jansrud
 Men's Combined Disciplines Downhill winner:  Aksel Lund Svindal
 Men's Downhill winner:  Aksel Lund Svindal
 Men's Slalom winner:  Henrik Kristoffersen
 January 15 & 17: FIS AS World Cup #22 in  Flachau #2
 Note: Was supposed to be held in Ofterschwang, but was cancelled, due to warm weather and lack of snow.
 Women's Slalom winner:  Veronika Velez-Zuzulová
 Women's Giant Slalom winner:  Viktoria Rebensburg
 January 19 – 24: FIS AS World Cup #23 in  Kitzbühel
 Men's Super G winner:  Aksel Lund Svindal
 Men's Alpine Combined winner:  Alexis Pinturault
 Men's Downhill winner:  Peter Fill
 Men's Slalom winner:  Henrik Kristoffersen
 January 21 – 24: FIS AS World Cup #24 in  Cortina d'Ampezzo
 Women's Super G winner:  Lindsey Vonn
 Women's Downhill winner:  Lindsey Vonn
 January 26: FIS AS World Cup #25 in  Schladming
 Men's Slalom winner:  Henrik Kristoffersen
 January 28 – 31: FIS AS World Cup #26 in  Garmisch-Partenkirchen #1
 Note: The Men's Giant Slalom event here was cancelled.
 Men's Downhill winner:  Aleksander Aamodt Kilde
 January 30 & 31: FIS AS World Cup #27 in  Maribor
 Note: The Women's slalom event here was cancelled.
 Women's Giant Slalom winner:  Viktoria Rebensburg
 February
 February 3 – 7: FIS AS World Cup #28 in  Jeongseon Alpine Centre (Olympic Test Event for 2018)
 Men's Downhill winner:  Kjetil Jansrud
 Men's Super G winner:  Carlo Janka
 February 4 – 7: FIS AS World Cup #29 in  Garmisch-Partenkirchen #2
 Women's Downhill winner:  Lindsey Vonn
 Women's Super G winner:  Lara Gut
 February 11 – 15: FIS AS World Cup #30 in  Crans-Montana
 Note: The two Women's Downhill events and the Women's Combined Downhill event cancelled.
 Women's Slalom winner:  Mikaela Shiffrin
 February 13 & 14: FIS AS World Cup #31 in  Naeba Ski Resort
 Men's Giant Slalom winner:  Alexis Pinturault
 Men's Slalom winner:  Felix Neureuther
 February 17 – 20: FIS AS World Cup #34 in  Chamonix
 Men's Combined Disciplines Downhill winner:  Blaise Giezendanner
 Men's Alpine Combined winner:  Alexis Pinturault
 Men's Downhill winner:  Dominik Paris
 February 18 – 21: FIS AS World Cup #35 in  La Thuile, Aosta Valley
 Women's Downhill #1 winner:  Lara Gut
 Women's Downhill #2 winner:  Nadia Fanchini
 Women's Super G winner:  Tina Weirather
 February 23: FIS AS World Cup #36 in  Stockholm
 Men's City Event winner:  Marcel Hirscher
 Women's City Event winner:  Wendy Holdener
 February 26 – 28: FIS AS World Cup #37 in  Hinterstoder
 Men's Giant Slalom #1 winner:  Alexis Pinturault
 Men's Giant Slalom #2 winner:  Alexis Pinturault
 Men's Super G winner:  Aleksander Aamodt Kilde
 February 27 & 28: FIS AS World Cup #38 in  Soldeu-El Tarter
 Women's Alpine Combined winner:  Marie-Michèle Gagnon
 Women's Combined Disciplines Super G winner:  Lindsey Vonn
 Women's Super G winner:  Federica Brignone
 March
 March 4 – 6: FIS AS World Cup #39 in  Kranjska Gora
 Men's Giant Slalom #1 winner:  Alexis Pinturault
 Men's Giant Slalom #2 winner:  Marcel Hirscher
 Men's Slalom winner:  Marcel Hirscher
 March 6 & 7: FIS AS World Cup #40 in  Jasná
 Women's Slalom winner:  Mikaela Shiffrin
 Women's Giant Slalom winner:  Eva-Maria Brem
 March 10 – 13: FIS AS World Cup #41 in  Kvitfjell
 Men's Downhill winner:  Dominik Paris
 Men's Super G winner:  Kjetil Jansrud
 March 12 & 13: FIS AS World Cup #42 in  Lenzerheide
 Women's Super G winner:  Cornelia Hütter
 Women's Alpine Combined winner:  Wendy Holdener
 Women's Combined Disciplines Super G winner:  Laurenne Ross
 March 14 – 20: FIS AS World Cup #43 (final) in  St. Moritz
 Men's Downhill winner:  Beat Feuz
 Men's Super G winner:  Beat Feuz
 Men's Slalom winner:  André Myhrer
 Men's Giant Slalom winner:  Thomas Fanara
 Women's Downhill winner:  Mirjam Puchner
 Women's Super G winner:  Tina Weirather
 Women's Slalom winner:  Mikaela Shiffrin
 Women's Giant Slalom winner:  Viktoria Rebensburg
 Women's Team Grand Prix winners:  (Wendy Holdener, Daniel Yule, Michelle Gisin, Reto Schmidiger, Charlotte Chable, Justin Murisier)

2015–16 FIS European Cup
 Events in  Åre was cancelled
 December 2 & 3: European Cup #2 in  Hemsedal
 Men's Slalom #1 winner:  Ramon Zenhäusern
 Men's Slalom #2 winner:  Marco Schwarz
 December 5 & 6: European Cup #3 in  Trysil
 Men's Giant Slalom #1 winner:  Manuel Feller
 Men's Giant Slalom #2 winner:  Manuel Feller
 December 7 & 8: European Cup #4 in  Trysil
 Women's Slalom winner:  Petra Vlhova
 Women's Giant Slalom winner:  Stephanie Brunner
 December 10–12: European Cup #5 in  Kvitfjell
 Women's Giant Slalom winner:  Laura Pirovano
 Women's Super G #1 winner:  Michaela Heider
 Women's Super G #2 winner:  Michaela Heider
 Women's Alpine combined winner:  Maren Skjoeld
 December 10 & 11: European Cup #6 in  Sölden
 Men's Super G #1 winner:  Christopher Neumayer
 Men's Super G #2 winner:  Christian Walder
 Men's Alpine Combined winner:  Bjørnar Neteland
 December 15 – 18: European Cup #7 in  St. Moritz
 This stage was cancelled
 December 16: European Cup #8 in  Obereggen
 Men's Slalom winner:  Robin Buffet
 December 19: European Cup #9 in  Kronplatz
 Men's Parallel Slalom winner:  Christian Hirschbuehl
 December 21: European Cup #10 in  Pozza di Fassa
 Men's Slalom winner:  Marc Gini
 January 3 & 4: European Cup #11 in  Val Cenis
 Men's Slalom winner:  Marc Gini
 Men's Slalom winner:  Robin Buffet
 January 4–7: European Cup #12 in  Zinal
 Women's Giant Slalom #1 winner:  Karoline Pichler
 Women's Giant Slalom #2 winner:  Stephanie Brunner
 Women's Slalom #1 winner:  Ana Bucik
 Women's Slalom #2 winner:  Ana Bucik
 January 6–9: European Cup #13 in  Wengen
 This stage was cancelled
 January 11–15: European Cup #14 in  Altenmarkt im Pongau
 Women's Downhill #1 winner:  Breezy Johnson
 Women's Downhill #2 winner:  Joana Hählen
 Women's Super G it's cancelled
 Women's Downhill #3 winner:  Kira Weidle
 January 13: European Cup #15 in  Folgaria–Lavarone
 Men's Giant Slalom #1 winner:  Riccardo Tonetti
 Men's Giant Slalom #2 winner:  Simon Maurberger
 January 14 & 15: European Cup #16 in  Radstadt–Reiteralm
 Men's Super G #1 winner:  Emanuele Buzzi
 Men's Super G #2 winner:  Marcus Monsen /  Bjørnar Neteland
 January 16 & 17: European Cup #17 in  Zell am See
 Men's Slalom #1 winner:  François Place
 Men's Slalom #2 winner:  Matej Vidović
 January 16 & 17: European Cup #18 in  Hochkar–Göstling
 Women's Giant Slalom winner:  Stephanie Brunner
 Women's Slalom  winner:  Elisabeth Willibald
 January 20 & 21: European Cup #19 in  Val-d'Isère
 Men's Giant Slalom #1 winner:  Loïc Meillard
 Men's Giant Slalom #2 winner:  Loïc Meillard
 January 21 & 22: European Cup #20 in  Bad Hindelang–Oberjoch #1
 Women's Slalom #1 winner:  Katharina Gallhuber
 Women's Slalom #2 winner:  Maren Skjoeld
 January 23 – 26: European Cup #21 in  Méribel
 Event's cancelled
 January 25 & 26: European Cup #22 in  Châtel
 Women's Super G #1 winner:  Romane Miradoli
 Women's Super G #2 winner:  Lisa Magdalena Agerer
 Women's Alpine combined winner:  Rahel Kopp
 January 25 – 27: European Cup #23 in  Davos
 Men's Downhill #1 winner:  Emanuele Buzzi
 Men's Downhill #2 winner:  Ralph Weber
 January 28 & 29: European Cup #24 in  Sestriere
 Women's Giant Slalom winner:  Stephanie Brunner
 Women's Slalom winner:  Elisabeth Willibald
 January 28 & 29: European Cup #25 in  Zuoz
 Men's Giant Slalom #1 winner:  Benedikt Staubitzer
 Men's Giant Slalom #2 winner:  Eemeli Pirinen
 February 1 – 5: European Cup #26 in  Davos
 Women's Downhill #1 winner:  Beatrice Scalvedi
 Women's Downhill #2 winner:  Anna Hofer
 Women's Super G winner:  Verena Gasslitter
 February 1 – 5: European Cup #27 in  Sarntal–Reinswald
 Men's Downhill #1 winner:  Frederic Berthold
 Men's Downhill #2 winner:  Nicolas Raffort
 Men's Alpine combined winner:  Paolo Pangrazzi
 Men's Super G winner:  Stian Saugestad
 February 9 & 10: European Cup #28 in  Pamporovo
 Women's Slalom #1 winner:  Ksenia Alopina
 Women's Slalom #2 winner:  Anna Swenn-Larsson
 February 12 & 13: European Cup #29 in  Borovets
 Women's Giant Slalom #1 winner:  Stephanie Brunner
 Women's Giant Slalom #2 winner:  Simone Wild
 March 8 – 12: European Cup #30 in  Saalbach-Hinterglemm
 March 12 & 13: European Cup #31 in  Bad Hindelang–Oberjoch #2
 March 15 – 17: European Cup #32 (final) in  La Molina

2015–16 FIS North America Cup of Alpine Skiing
 November 24 – 27: FIS North America Cup #1 in  Jackson
 Women's Slalom #1 winner:  Marie-Michèle Gagnon
 Women's Slalom #2 winner:  Erin Mielzynski
 Men's Slalom #1 winner:  Andrea Ballerini
 Men's Slalom #2 winner:  Espen Lysdahl
 November 30 – December 3: FIS North America Cup #2 in  Copper Mountain
 Men's Giant Slalom #1 winner:  Tommy Ford
 Men's Giant Slalom #2 winner:  Tommy Ford
 Women's Giant Slalom #1 winner:  Marie-Michèle Gagnon
 Women's Giant Slalom #2 winner:  Marie-Michèle Gagnon
 December 7–11: FIS North America Cup #3 in  Lake Louise
 Men's Downhill #1 winner:  Jeffrey Frisch
 Men's Downhill #2 winner:  Natko Zrnčić-Dim
 Women's Downhill #1 winner:  Cecily Decker
 Women's Downhill #2 winner:  Breezy Johnson
 December 12–17: FIS North America Cup #4 in  Panorama
 Men's Super G winner:  Tyler Werry
 Men's Alpine combined winner:  Erik Read
 Women's Super G winner:  Anna Marno
 Women's Alpine combined winner:  Megan McJames
 Men's Giant Slalom #1 winner:  Erik Read
 Men's Giant Slalom #2 winner:  Joan Verdu Sanchez
 Women's Giant Slalom #1 winner:  Kristine Gjelsten Haugen
 Women's Giant Slalom #2 winner:  Kristine Gjelsten Haugen
 Women's Slalom #1 winner:  Lila Lapanja
 Women's Slalom #2 winner:  Lila Lapanja
 Men's Slalom #1 winner:  Erik Read
 Men's Slalom #2 winner:  Erik Read
 February 4 & 5, 2016: FIS North America Cup #5 in  Mont Garceau
 Women's Giant Slalom #1 winner:  Megan McJames
 Women's Giant Slalom #2 winner:  Paula Moltzan
 February 4 – 7, 2016: FIS North America Cup #6 in  Mont-Sainte-Anne
 Men's Giant Slalom #1 winner:  Brennan Rubie
 Men's Giant Slalom #2 winner:  Brennan Rubie
 Men's Slalom #1 winner:  Tim Kelley
 Men's Slalom #2 winner:  Michael Matt
 February 6 & 7, 2016: FIS North America Cup #7 in  Mont Tremblant Resort
 Women's Slalom #1 winner:  Lila Lapanja
 Women's Slalom #2 winner:  Alexandra Tilley
 February 9 – 12, 2016: FIS North America Cup #8 in  Whiteface Mountain
 Men's Giant Slalom winner:  Stefan Brennsteiner
 Women's Giant Slalom winner:  Megan McJames
 Men's Alpine combined winner:  James Crawford
 Women's Alpine combined winner:  Megan McJames
 Men's Super G #1 winner:  Erik Arvidsson
 Men's Super G #2 winner:  James Crawford
 Women's Super G #1 winner:  Megan McJames
 Women's Super G #2 winner:  Candace Crawford

Alpine Skiing FIS Far East Cup 2015–2016
 December 15–18, 2015: FIS Far East Cup #1 in  Zhangjiakou
 Men's Slalom #1 winner:  Kim Hyeon-tae
 Men's Slalom #2 winner:  Ryunosuke Ohkoshi
 Women's Slalom #1 winner:  Martina Dubovská
 Women's Slalom #2 winner:  Martina Dubovská
 Men's Giant Slalom #1 winner:  Dmitrij Ulyanov
 Men's Giant Slalom #2 winner:  Hideyuki Narita
 Women's Giant Slalom #1 winner:  Martina Dubovská
 Women's Giant Slalom #2 winner:  Asa Ando
 January 14–16, 2016: FIS Far East Cup #2 in  Bear's Town–Seoul
 Women's Slalom winner:  Daria Ovchinikova
 Men's Slalom winner:  Ryunosuke Ohkoshi
 Women's Slalom winner: Asa Ando
 Men's Slalom winner:  Jung Dong-hyun
 January 18 & 19, 2016: FIS Far East Cup #3 in  Jisan Resort
 Women's Slalom #1 winner:  Maruša Ferk
 Women's Slalom #2 winner:  Maruša Ferk
 Men's Slalom #1 winner:  Ryunosuke Ohkoshi
 Men's Slalom #2 winner:  Jung Dong-hyun
 January 20 – 22, 2016: FIS Far East Cup #4 in  Yongpyong Ski Resort
 Women's Giant Slalom #1 winner:  Emi Hasegawa
 Women's Giant Slalom #2 winner:  Emi Hasegawa
 Men's Giant Slalom #1 winner:  Evgenij Pyasik
 Men's Giant Slalom #2 winner:  Evgenij Pyasik
 Men's Slalom winner:  Sergei Maitakov
 Women's Slalom winner:  Kang Young-seo
 January 25 – 28, 2016: FIS Far East Cup #5 in  Jeongseon Alpine Centre
 Events cancelled
 February 29 – March 1, 2016: FIS Far East Cup #6 in  Hakuba
 Men's Slalom #1 winner:  Jung Dong-hyun
 Men's Slalom #2 winner:  Ryunosuke Ohkoshi
 Women's Slalom #1 winner:  Emi Hasegawa
 Women's Slalom #2 winner:  Emi Hasegawa

2016 IPC Alpine Skiing World Cup
 January 15 & 16: IPC AS World Cup #1 in  Kranjska Gora
 Note: Event was moved from Abtenau, Austria, due to lack of snow.
 For results, click here.
 January 18 & 19: IPC AS World Cup #2 in  Tarvisio
 For results, click here.
 January 21 – 23: IPC AS World Cup #3 in  St. Moritz
 For results, click here.
 January 25 – 29: IPC AS World Cup #4 in  Tignes
 For results, click here.
 February 24 – 26: IPC AS World Cup #5 in  Aspen Mountain
 For results, click here.
 February 28 – March 4: IPC AS World Cup #6 (final) in  Aspen Buttermilk
 For results, click here.

Alpine Skiing FIS South American Cup 
 August 7 – : Alpine Skiing FIS South American Cup 2015
 August 7: FIS South American Cup #1 in  Chapelco
 Men's Giant Slalom winner:  Henrik von Appen
 Women's Giant Slalom winner:  Barbara Kantorová
 August 11 – 12: FIS South American Cup #2 in  Cerro Catedral
 Men's Slalom winner:  Tomas Birkner De Miguel
 Women's Slalom winner:  Salomé Báncora
 Men's Giant Slalom winner:  Sebastiano Gastaldi
 Women's Giant Slalom winner:  Noelle Barahona
 August 15: FIS South American Cup #3 in  Antillanca
 Men's Slalom winner:  Federico Vietti
 Women's Slalom winner:  Barbara Kantorová
 August 27: FIS South American Cup #4 in  Valle Nevado
 Men's Super G winner:  Klaus Brandner
 Women's Super G winner:  Noelle Barahona
 August 29: FIS South American Cup #5 in  El Colorado
 Men's Giant Slalom winner:  Aleksander Aamodt Kilde
 Women's Giant Slalom winner:  Noelle Barahona
 August 30 – September 4: FIS South American Cup #6 in  La Parva
 Men's Slalom winner:  Štefan Hadalin
 Women's Slalom winner:  Salomé Báncora
 Men's Downhill #1 winner:  Blaise Giezendanner
 Men's Downhill #2 winner:  Boštjan Kline
 Women's Downhill #1 winner:  Ilka Štuhec
 Women's Downhill #2 winner:  Ilka Štuhec
 Men's Super G winner:  Andreas Sander
 Women's Super G winner:  Ilka Štuhec
 September 14 – 16: FIS South American Cup #7 in  El Colorado
 Men's Downhill (Downhill in two runs) winner:  Artem Borodaykin
 Women's Downhill #1 winner:  Ester Ledecká
 Women's Downhill #2 winner:  Ester Ledecká
 Men's Super G #1 winner:  Josef Ferstl
 Men's Alpine Combined #1 winner:  Pavel Trikhichev
 Men's Super G #2 winner:  Klaus Brandner
 Men's Alpine Combined #2 winner:  Pavel Trikhichev
 Women's Alpine Combined #1 winner:  Ester Ledecká
 Women's Super G #1 winner:  Ester Ledecká
 Women's Alpine Combined #2 winner:  Ester Ledecká
 Women's Super G #2 winner:  Ester Ledecká
 September 21 – 24: FIS South American Cup #8 in  Cerro Castor
 Men's Giant Slalom winner:  Aleksander Andrienko
 Women's Giant Slalom winner:  Coralie Frasse Sombet
 Men's slalom winner:  Cristian Javier Simari Birkner
 Women's slalom winner:  Salome Bancora

Alpine Skiing FIS Australian New Zealand Cup 
 August 22 – : Alpine Skiing FIS Australian New Zealand Cup 2015
  22 – 26 August: FIS Australian New Zealand Cup #1 in  Perisher
 Men's Slalom #1 winner:  Robby Kelley
 Women's Slalom #1 winner:  Piera Hudson
 Men's Slalom #2 winner:  Adam Žampa
 Women's Slalom #2 winner:  Madison Lord
 Men's Giant Slalom winner:  Adam Žampa
 Women's Giant Slalom #1 winner:  Piera Hudson
 Women's Giant Slalom #2 winner:  Eliza Grigg
 24 – 30 August: FIS Australian New Zealand Cup #2 in  Coronet Peak
 Men's Slalom winner:  Adam Žampa
 Women's Slalom winner:  Katharina Truppe
 Men's Giant Slalom winner:  Adam Žampa
 Women's Giant Slalom winner:  Chiara Mair
 26 August – 2 September: FIS Australian New Zealand Cup #3 in  Coronet Peak
 Women's Giant Slalom #1 winner:  Mina Fürst Holtmann
 Men's Slalom winner:  Marco Schwarz
 Women's Slalom winner:  Mina Fürst Holtmann
 Men's Giant Slalom #1  winner:  Christian Hirschbuehl
 Men's Giant Slalom #2 winner:  Adam Žampa
 4 – 5 September: FIS Australian New Zealand Cup #4 in  Treble Cone
 Men's Slalom winner:  Michał Jasiczek
 Women's Slalom winner:  Charlotte Guest
 Men's Giant Slalom winner:  Kevyn Read
 Women's Giant Slalom winner:  Elisabeth Kappaurer

Grass Skiing World Championships
 September 2–5: Grass Skiing FIS World Championships 2015 in  Tambre (Non-Olympic Event)
 Men's Grass Super G winner:  Mattia Arrigoni
 Women's Grass Super G winner:  Barbara Míková
 Men's Grass Super Combined winner:  Jan Němec
 Women's Grass Super Combined winner:  Barbara Míková
 Men's Grass Slalom winner:  Michael Stocker
 Women's Grass Slalom winner:  Chisaki Maeda
 Men's Grass Giant Slalom winner:  Fausto Cerentin
 Women's Grass Giant Slalom winner:  Barbara Míková

Biathlon

International biathlon championships and Winter Youth Olympics
 January 26 – February 2: 2016 IBU Youth/Junior World Championships in  Cheile–Grădiștei (Brașov)

  and  won 4 gold medals each. Norway won the overall medal tally.
 February 14 – 21: 2016 Winter Youth Olympics in  Lillehammer
 Boy's 7.5 km Sprint winners:   Emilien Claude;   Sivert Guttorm Bakken;   Egor Tutmin
 Girl's 6 km Sprint winners:   Juliane Frühwirt;   Marthe Kråkstad Johansen;   Arina Pantova
 Boy's 10 km Pursuit winners:   Sivert Guttorm Bakken;   Egor Tutmin;   Said Karimulla Khalili
 Girl's 7.5 km Pursuit winners:   Khrystyna Dmytrenko;   Marthe Kråkstad Johansen;   Lou Jeanmonnot-Laurent
 Regular Mixed Relay winners:  ;  ;  
 Single Mixed Relay winners (debut event):
   ZHU Zhenyu and MENG Fanqi
   Fredrik Qvist Buchen-Johannessen and Marthe Krakstad Johansen
   Egor Tutmin and Ekaterina Ponedelko
 February 22 – 28: 2016 IBU Open European Championships in  Tyumen
 Men's 10 km Sprint winner:  Evgeniy Garanichev
 Women's 7.5 km Sprint winner:  Nadine Horchler
 Men's 12.5 km Pursuit winner:  Anton Babikov
 Women's 10 km Pursuit winner:  Nadezhda Skardino
 Men's 15 km Mass Start winner:  Florian Graf
 Women's 12.5 km Mass Start winner:  Luise Kummer
 Single Mixed Relay winners:  (Victoria Slivko, Anton Babikov)
 Mixed 2x6+2x7.5 km Team Relay winners:  (Anastasia Zagoruiko, Olga Iakushova, Matvey Eliseev, Evgeniy Garanichev)
 March 2 – 13: Biathlon World Championships 2016 in  Oslo–Holmenkollen
 Men's 10 km Sprint winner:  Martin Fourcade
 Women's 7.5 km Sprint winner:  Tiril Eckhoff
 Men's 12.5 km Pursuit winner:  Martin Fourcade
 Women's 10 km Pursuit winner:  Laura Dahlmeier
 Men's 20 km Individual winner:  Martin Fourcade
 Women's 15 km Individual winner:  Marie Dorin Habert
 Men's 15 km Mass Start winner:  Johannes Thingnes Bø
 Women's 12.5 km Mass Start winner:  Marie Dorin Habert
 Men's 4x7.5 km Relay winner:  (Ole Einar Bjørndalen, Tarjei Bø, Johannes Thingnes Bø, Emil Hegle Svendsen)
 Women's 4x6 km Relay winner:  (Synnøve Solemdal, Fanny Horn Birkeland, Tiril Eckhoff, Marte Olsbu)
 Mixed 2x6+2x7.5 km Team Relay winners:  (Anaïs Bescond, Marie Dorin Habert, Quentin Fillon Maillet, Martin Fourcade)
 March 16 – 20: 2016 IBU Junior Open European Championships in  Pokljuka
 Junior Men's 15 km Individual winner:  Viktar Kryuko
 Junior Women's 12.5 km Individual winner:  Anastasiya Merkushyna
 Junior Men's 10 km Sprint winner:  Viktar Kryuko
 Junior Women's 7.5 km Sprint winner:  Lena Arnaud
 Junior Men's 12.5 km Pursuit winner:  David Zobel
 Junior Women's 10 km Pursuit winner:  Julia Simon

2015–16 Biathlon World Cup
 November 30 – December 6, 2015: IBU World Cup #1 in  Östersund
 Men's 12.5 km Pursuit winner:  Martin Fourcade
 Women's 10 km Pursuit winner:  Kaisa Mäkäräinen
 Men's 10 km Sprint winner:  Martin Fourcade
 Women's 7.5 km Sprint winner:  Gabriela Soukalová
 Men's 20 km Individual winner:  Ole Einar Bjørndalen
 Women's 15 km Individual winner:  Dorothea Wierer
 Mixed 2x6 km+2x7.5 km Team Relay winners:  (Fanny Horn Birkeland, Tiril Eckhoff, Johannes Thingnes Bø, Tarjei Bø)
 Mixed Single Team Relay winners:  (Kaia Wøien Nicolaisen, Lars Helge Birkeland)
 December 7 – 13, 2015: IBU World Cup #2 in  Hochfilzen
 Men's 10 km Sprint winner:  Simon Schempp
 Women's 7.5 km Sprint winner:  Franziska Hildebrand
 Men's 12.5 km Pursuit winner:  Martin Fourcade
 Women's 10 km Pursuit winner:  Laura Dahlmeier
 Men's 4x7.5 km Team Relay winners:  (Alexey Volkov, Evgeniy Garanichev, Dmitry Malyshko, Anton Shipulin)
 Women's 4x6km Team Relay winners:  (Lisa Vittozzi, Karin Oberhofer, Federica Sanfilippo, Dorothea Wierer)
 December 14 – 20, 2015: IBU World Cup #3 in  Pokljuka
 Men's 10 km Sprint winner:  Simon Schempp
 Women's 7.5 km Sprint winner:  Marie Dorin Habert
 Men's 12.5 km Pursuit winner:  Simon Schempp
 Women's 10 km Pursuit winner:  Laura Dahlmeier
 Men's 15 km Μass Start winner:  Jean-Guillaume Béatrix
 Women's 12.5 km Μass Start winner:  Kaisa Mäkäräinen
 January 7 – 10: IBU World Cup #4 in  Ruhpolding #1
 Men's 10 km Sprint winner:  Johannes Thingnes Bø
 Women's 7.5 km Sprint winner:  Franziska Hildebrand
 Men's 12.5 km Pursuit winner:  Simon Eder
 Women's 10 km Pursuit winner:  Laura Dahlmeier
 Men's 15 km Mass Start winner:  Martin Fourcade
 Women's 12.5 km Mass Start winner:  Laura Dahlmeier
 January 12 – 17: IBU World Cup #5 in  Ruhpolding #2
 Men's 20 km Individual winner:  Martin Fourcade
 Women's 15 km Individual winner:  Dorothea Wierer
 Men's 15 km Mass Start winner:  Erik Lesser
 Women's 12.5 km Mass Start winner:  Gabriela Soukalová
 Men's 4x7.5 km Team Relay winners:  (Ole Einar Bjørndalen, Johannes Thingnes Bø, Tarjei Bø, Emil Hegle Svendsen)
 Women's 4x6 km Team Relay winners:  (Iryna Varvynets, Yuliia Dzhima, Valj Semerenko, Olena Pidhrushna)
 January 20 – 24: IBU World Cup #6 in  Antholz-Anterselva
 Men's 10 km Sprint winner:  Simon Schempp
 Women's 7.5 km Sprint winner:  Olga Podchufarova
 Men's 12.5 km Pursuit winner:  Anton Shipulin
 Women's 10 km Pursuit winner:  Ekaterina Yurlova
 Men's 4x7.5 km Team Relay winners:  (Maxim Tsvetkov, Evgeniy Garanichev, Dmitry Malyshko, Anton Shipulin)
 Women's 4x6 km Team Relay winners:  (Justine Braisaz, Anaïs Bescond, Anaïs Chevalier, Marie Dorin Habert)
 February 1 – 7: IBU World Cup #7 in  Canmore, Alberta
 Men's 10 km Sprint winner:  Martin Fourcade
 Women's 7.5 km Sprint winner:  Olena Pidhrushna
 Men's 15 km Mass Start winner:  Dominik Windisch
 Women's 12.5 km Mass Start winner:  Dorothea Wierer
 Mixed Single Team Relay winners:  (Marie Dorin Habert, Martin Fourcade)
 Mixed 2x6 km+2x7.5 km Team Relay winners:  (Franziska Hildebrand, Franziska Preuß, Arnd Peiffer, Simon Schempp)
 February 8 – 14: IBU World Cup #8 in  Presque Isle, Maine
 Men's 10 km Sprint winner:  Johannes Thingnes Bø
 Women's 7.5 km Sprint winner:  Gabriela Soukalová
 Men's 12.5 km Pursuit winner:  Martin Fourcade
 Women's 10 km Pursuit winner:  Gabriela Soukalová
 Men's 4x7.5 km Team Relay winners:  (Lars Helge Birkeland, Erlend Bjoentegaard, Johannes Thingnes Bø, Tarjei Bø)
 Women's 4x6 km Team Relay winners:  (Eva Puskarčíková, Lucie Charvatova, Gabriela Soukalová, Veronika Vítková)
 March 16 – 20: IBU World Cup #9 (final) in  Khanty-Mansiysk
 Note: Both men's and women's mass start events were cancelled.
 Men's 10 km Sprint winner:  Julian Eberhard
 Women's 7.5 km Sprint winner:  Kaisa Mäkäräinen
 Men's 12.5 km Pursuit winner:  Simon Schempp
 Women's 10 km Pursuit winner:  Kaisa Mäkäräinen

2015–16 Winter IBU Cup
 November 27 – 29, 2015: Cup #1 in  Idre
 Men's 10 km Sprint #1 winner:  Petr Pashchenko
 Men's 10 km Sprint #2 winner:  Matvey Eliseev
 Women's 7.5 km Sprint #1 winner:  Magdalena Gwizdoń
 Women's 7.5 km Sprint #2 winner:  Bente Landheim
 December 10 – 13, 2015: Cup #2 in  Ridnaun-Val Ridanna
 Men's 10 km Sprint winner:  Anton Babikov
 Women's 7.5 km Sprint winner:  Iryna Varvynets
 Men's 12.5 Pursuit winner:  Anton Babikov
 Women's 10 km Pursuit winner:  Galina Nechkasova
 Mixed Single Team Relay winners:  (Anaïs Chevalier, Aristide Bègue)
 Mixed 2x6 km+2x7.5 km Team Relay winners:  (Victoria Slivko, Uliana Kaisheva, Matvey Eliseev, Alexey Volkov)
 December 17 – 19, 2015: Cup #3 in  Obertilliach
 Men's 20 km Individual winner:  Matvey Eliseev
 Women's 15 km Individual winner:  Svetlana Sleptsova
 Men's 10 km Sprint winner:  Timofey Lapshin
 Women's 7.5 km Sprint winner:  Tatiana Akimova
 January 8 – 10: Cup #4 in  Nové Město na Moravě
 Men's 10 km Sprint #1 winner:  Fabien Claude
 Men's 10 km Sprint #2 winner:  Petr Pashchenko
 Women's 7.5 km Sprint #1 winner:  Olga Iakushova
 Women's 7.5 km Sprint #2 winner:  Anaïs Chevalier
 January 13 – 17: Cup #5 in  Ridnaun–Val Ridanna
 Men's 10 km Sprint winner:  Anton Babikov
 Women's 7.5 km Sprint winner:  Coline Varcin
 Men's 12.5 km Pursuit winner:  Alexey Slepov
 Women's 10 km Pursuit winner:  Svetlana Sleptsova
 Mixed 2x6km+2x7.5 km Team Relay winners:  (Yuliya Zhuravok, Nadiia Bielkina, Andriy Dotsenko, Artem Pryma)
 January 20 – 23: Cup #6 in  Großer Arber
 Men's 10 km Sprint winner:  Matvey Eliseev
 Women's 7.5 km Sprint winner:  Olga Iakushova
 Men's 12.5 km Pursuit winner:  Yury Shopin
 Women's 10 km Pursuit winner:  Olga Iakushova
 Mixed Single Mixed Relay winners:  (Anastasiya Merkushyna, Artem Tyshchenko)
 Mixed 2x6+2x7.5 km Team Relay winners:  (Nadiia Bielkina, Iana Bondar, Ruslan Tkalenko, Dmytro Rusinov)
 February 12 – 14: Cup #7 in  Brezno–Osrblie
 Men's 20 km Individual winner:  Matvey Eliseev
 Women's 15 km Individual winner:  Marine Bolliet
 Men's 10 km Sprint winner:  Eduard Latypov
 Women's 7.5 km Sprint winner:  Tiril Eckhoff
 March 9 – 13: Cup #8 (final) in  Martell-Val Martello
 Men's 10 km Sprint #1 winner:  Antonin Guigonnat
 Women's 7.5 km Sprint #1 winner:  Marine Bolliet
 Men's 10 km Sprint #2 winner:  Alexey Slepov
 Women's 7.5 km Sprint #2 winner:  Nadiia Bielkina
 Mixed Single Mixed Relay winners:  (Galina Nechkasova, Yury Shopin)
 Mixed 2x6+2x7.5 km Team Relay winners:  (Svetlana Sleptsova, Anna Shcherbinina, Semen Suchilov, Alexey Slepov)

2015–16 IPC Biathlon World Cup
 December 2 – 9, 2015: IPC Biathlon World Cup #1 in  Tyumen

 For results, click here.
 February 21 – 28: IPC Biathlon World Cup #2 in  Finsterau
 For results, click here.
 March 15 – 20: IPC Biathlon World Cup #3 (final) in   Vuokatti
 For results, click here.

Cross-country skiing

2016 Winter Youth Olympics (CCS)
 February 10 – 16: 1st World University Ski Orienteering Championship in  Tula
 Sprint winners:  Stanimir Belomazhev (m) /  Sonja Morsky (f)
 Pursuit winners:  Stanimir Belomazhev (m) /  Anna Ulvensoen (f)
 Mass Start winners:  Stanimir Belomazhev (m) /  Mira Kaskinen (f)
 Mixed Relay winners:  (Jørgen Madslien, Anna Ulvensoen)
 February 13 – 18: 2016 Winter Youth Olympics in  Lillehammer
 Boy's Sprint Classic winners:   Thomas Helland Larsen;   Magnus Kim;   Vebjørn Hegdal
 Girl's Sprint Classic winners:   Johanna Hagström;   Yuliya Petrova;   Martine Engebretsen
 Boy's 10 km Freestyle winners:   Magnus Kim;    Vebjørn Hegdal;   Igor Fedotov
 Girl's 5 km Freestyle winners:   Maya Yakunina;   Chi Chunxue;   Rebecca Immonen
 Boy's XC Cross Freestyle winners (debut event):   Magnus Kim;   Thomas Helland Larsen;   Lauri Mannila
 Girl's XC Cross Freestyle winners (debut event):   Moa Lundgren;   Johanna Hagström;   Laura Chamiot Maitral
 February 22 – 28: 2016 FIS Nordic Junior World Ski Championships in  Râșnov
 Men's U23 1.3 km Sprint Freestyle winner:  Lucas Chanavat
 Men's Junior 1.3 km Sprint Freestyle winner:  Johannes Hoesflot Klaebo
 Men's U23 15 km Classic winner:  Jens Burman
 Men's Junior 10 km Classic  Johannes Hoesflot Klaebo
 Women's U23 1.3 km Sprint Freestyle winner:  Jonna Sundling
 Women's Junior 1.3 km Sprint Freestyle winner:  Amalie Håkonsen Ous
 Women's U23 10 km Classic winner:  Anastasia Sedova
 Women's Junior 5 km Classic winner:  Marte Mæhlum Johansen
 Men's U23 15 km Free winner:  Simen Hegstad Krüger
 Women's U23 10 km Free winner:  Victoria Carl
 Men's Junior 15 km winner:  Ivan Yakimushkin
 Women's Junior 10 km Free winner:  Ebba Andersson
 Men's 4 x 5 km Relay winners:  (Mattis Stenshagen, Vebjørn Hegdal, Jan Thomas Jenssen, Johannes Hoesflot Klaebo)
 Women's 4 x 2.5 km Relay winners:  (Emma Ribom, Elina Roennlund, Ebba Andersson, Jenny Solin)

2016 Tour de Ski
 January 1 – 3: TdS #1 in  Lenzerheide
 Men's Sprint Freestyle winner:  Federico Pellegrino
 Women's Sprint Freestyle winner:  Maiken Caspersen Falla
 Men's 30 km Classical Mass Start winner:  Martin Johnsrud Sundby
 Women's 15 km Classical Mass Start winner:  Therese Johaug
 Men's 10 km Freestyle Pursuit winner:  Martin Johnsrud Sundby
 Women's 5 km Freestyle Pursuit winner:  Ingvild Flugstad Østberg
 January 5 & 6: TdS #2 in  Oberstdorf
 Men's Sprint Classical winner:  Emil Iversen
 Women's Sprint Classical winner:  Sophie Caldwell
 Men's 15 km Classical Mass Start winner:  Alexey Poltoranin
 Women's 10 km Classical Mass Start winner:  Therese Johaug
 January 8: TdS #3 in  Toblach
 Men's 10 km Freestyle winner:  Finn Hågen Krogh
 Women's 5 km Freestyle winner:  Jessie Diggins
 January 9 & 10: TdS #4 (final) in  Fiemme Valley
 Men's 15 km Classical Mass Start winner:  Martin Johnsrud Sundby
 Women's 10 km Classical Mass Start winner:  Heidi Weng
 Men's 9 km Freestyle Pursuit winner:  Martin Johnsrud Sundby
 Women's 9 km Freestyle Pursuit winner:  Therese Johaug

2016 Ski Tour Canada
 Note: This tour makes its debut in this 2015–16 FIS Cross-Country skiing season.
 March 1: STC #1 in  Gatineau
 Men's Sprint Freestyle winner:  Sergey Ustiugov
 Women's Sprint Freestyle winner:  Maiken Caspersen Falla
 March 2: STC #2 in  Montreal
 Men's 17.5 km Classical Mass Start winner:  Emil Iversen
 Women's 10.5 km Classical Mass Start winner:  Therese Johaug
 March 4 & 5: STC #3 and #4 in  Quebec City
 Men's Sprint Freestyle winner:  Baptiste Gros
 Women's Sprint Freestyle winner:  Stina Nilsson
 Men's 15 km Freestyle Pursuit winner:  Sergey Ustiugov
 Women's 10 km Freestyle Pursuit winner:  Heidi Weng
 March 8 – 12: STC #5, #6, #7, and #8 (final) in  Canmore, Alberta
 Men's Sprint Classical winner:  Federico Pellegrino
 Women's Sprint Classical winner:  Maiken Caspersen Falla
 Men's Skiathlon winner:  Martin Johnsrud Sundby
 Women's Skiathlon winner:  Heidi Weng
 Men's 15 km Freestyle winner:  Matti Heikkinen
 Women's 10 km Freestyle winner:  Ingvild Flugstad Østberg
 Men's 15 km Classical Pursuit winner:  Martin Johnsrud Sundby
 Women's 10 km Classical Pursuit winner:  Therese Johaug

2015–16 FIS Cross-Country World Cup
 November 27 – 29, 2015: FIS CC World Cup #1 in  Rukatunturi, Kuusamo
 Men's 15 km Classical Pursuit winner:  Martin Johnsrud Sundby
 Women's 10 km Classical Pursuit winner:  Therese Johaug
 Men's 10 km Freestyle winner:  Martin Johnsrud Sundby
 Women's 5 km Freestyle winner:  Therese Johaug
 Men's Sprint Classical winner:  Sondre Turvoll Fossli
 Women's Sprint Classical winner:  Maiken Caspersen Falla
 December 5 & 6, 2015: FIS CC World Cup #2 in  Lillehammer
 Men's 30 km Skiathlon winner:  Martin Johnsrud Sundby
 Women's 15 km Skiathlon winner:  Therese Johaug
 Men's 4x7.5 km Team Relay winners:  (Niklas Dyrhaug, Hans Christer Holund, Martin Johnsrud Sundby, Petter Northug)
 Women's 4x5 km Team Relay winners:  (Maiken Caspersen Falla, Ingvild Flugstad Østberg, Therese Johaug, Heidi Weng)
 December 12 & 13, 2015: FIS CC World Cup #3 in  Davos
 Men's Sprint Freestyle winner:  Federico Pellegrino
 Women's Sprint Freestyle winner:  Stina Nilsson
 Men's 30 km Freestyle winner:  Martin Johnsrud Sundby
 Women's 15 km Freestyle winner:  Therese Johaug
 December 19 & 20, 2015: FIS CC World Cup #4 in  Toblach
 Men's Sprint Freestyle:  Federico Pellegrino
 Women's Sprint Freestyle:  Maiken Caspersen Falla
 Men's 15 km Classical winner:  Martin Johnsrud Sundby
 Women's 10 km Classical winner:  Therese Johaug
 January 16 & 17: FIS CC World Cup #5 in  Planica
 Men's Sprint Freestyle:  Federico Pellegrino
 Women's Sprint Freestyle winner:  Stina Nilsson
 Men's Team Sprint Freestyle winners:  (Dietmar Nöckler, Federico Pellegrino)
 Women's Team Sprint Freestyle winners:  (Ida Ingemarsdotter, Stina Nilsson)
 January 23 & 24: FIS CC World Cup #6 in  Nové Město na Moravě
 Men's 15 km Freestyle winner:  Maurice Manificat
 Women's 10 km Freestyle winner:  Therese Johaug
 Men's 4x7.5 km Team Relay winners:  (Sjur Røthe, Martin Johnsrud Sundby, Mathias Rundgreen, Finn Hågen Krogh)
 Women's 4x5 km Team Relay winners:  (Ingvild Flugstad Østberg, Heidi Weng, Therese Johaug, Astrid Uhrenholdt Jacobsen)
 February 3: FIS CC World Cup #7 in  Drammen
 Men's Sprint Classical winner:  Petter Northug
 Women's Sprint Classical winner:  Maiken Caspersen Falla
 February 6 & 7: FIS CC World Cup #8 in  Oslo
 Men's 50 km Classical Mass Start winner:  Martin Johnsrud Sundby
 Women's 30 km Classical Mass Start winner:  Therese Johaug
 February 11: FIS CC World Cup #9 in  Stockholm
 Men's Sprint Classical winner:  Nikita Kriukov
 Women's Sprint Classical winner:  Maiken Caspersen Falla
 February 13 & 14: FIS CC World Cup #10 in  Falun
 Men's 10 km Classical winner:  Maxim Vylegzhanin
 Women's 5 km Classical winner:  Therese Johaug
 Men's 15 km Freestyle Mass Start winner:  Sergey Ustiugov
 Women's 10 km Freestyle Mass Start winner:  Therese Johaug
 February 20 & 21: FIS CC World Cup #11 (final) in  Lahti
 Men's Sprint Freestyle winner:  Emil Iversen
 Women's Sprint Freestyle winner:  Maiken Caspersen Falla
 Men's Skiathlon winner:  Martin Johnsrud Sundby
 Women's Skiathlon winner:  Therese Johaug

Australia/New Zealand Cup
 July 25 & 26: Australia/New Zealand Cup #1 in  Perisher Valley
 Men's 1 km Free winner:  Phillip Bellingham
 Women's 1 km Free winner:  Barbara Jezeršek
 Women's 5 km Cross winner:  Barbara Jezeršek
 Men's 10 km Cross winner:  Callum Watson
 August 15 & 16: Australia/New Zealand Cup #2 in  Falls Creek
 Men's 1 km Free winner:  Phillip Bellingham
 Women's 1 km Free winner:  Katerina Paul
 Women's 10 km Free winner:  Barbara Jezeršek
 Men's 15 km Free winner:  Phillip Bellingham
 August 28 – 30: Australia/New Zealand Cup #3 in  Snow Farm
 Women's SP Cross winner:  Olivia Bouffard-Nesbitt
 Men's SP Cross winner:  Eun-Ho Kim
 Women's 10 km Cross winner:  Lee Chae-won
 Men's 15 km Cross winner:  Hwang Jun-ho
 Women's 5 km Free winner:  Barbara Jezeršek
 Men's 10 km Free winner:  Seong-Beom Park

Eastern Europe Cup 2015–2016
 November 20–24, 2015: Eastern Europe Cup #1 in  Vershina Tei
 Men's 10 km winner:  Nikita Stupak
 Women's 5 km winner:  Olga Kuziukova
 Men's 15 km winner:  Dmitriy Rostovtsev
 Women's 10 km winner:  Elena Soboleva
 December 23–27, 2015: Eastern Europe Cup #2 in  Krasnogorsk
 This events was cancelled
 January 14–17, 2016: Eastern Europe Cup #3 in  Raubichi–Minsk
 Men's 10 km winner:  Nikita Stupak
 Women's 5 km winner:  Daria Vedenina
 Women's 1.2 km Freestyle winner:  Elena Soboleva
 Men's 1.2 km Freestyle winner:  Andrey Parfenov
 Women's Skiatlon winner:  Daria Vedenina
 Men's Skiatlon winner:  Andrey Melnichenko
 February 12: Eastern Europe Cup #4 in  Krasnogorsk
 Men's 15 km winner:  Dmitry Japarov
 Women's 10 km winner:  Anastasia Vlasova
 February 14: Eastern Europe Cup #5 in  Moscow
 Women's 1.4 km Freestyle winner:  Olga Tsareva
 Men's 1.2 km Freestyle winner:  Nikolay Morilov
 February 25 – 29: Eastern Europe Cup #6 (final) in  Syktyvkar
 Men's 15 km Free winner:  Ivan Arteev
 Women's 10 km Free winner:  Olga Rocheva
 Men's 1.4 Sprint Classic winner:  Ermil Vokuev
 Women's 1.4 Sprint Classic winner:  Elena Soboleva
 Men's Skiathlon winner:  Petr Sedov
 Women's Skiathlon winner:  Olga Rocheva

US Super Tour 2015–2016
 November 24–28, 2015: US Super Tour #1 in  West Yellowstone
 Women's 10 km Freestyle winner:  Katharine Ogden
 Men's 15 km Freestyle winner:  Brian Gregg
 Men's 1.3 km Freestyle winner:  Logan Hanneman
 Women's 1.3 km Freestyle winner:  Jennie Bender
 December 5 & 6, 2015: US Super Tour #2 in  Copper Basin
 Women's 10 km winner:  Chelsea Holmes
 Men's 15 km winner:  Scott Patterson
 Men's 1.3 km Classic winner:  Dakota Blackhorse-von Jess
 Women's 1.3 km Classic winner:  Becca Rorabaugh
 January 30 & 31: US Super Tour #3 in  Mt. Van Hoevenberg Olympic Bobsled Run
 Men's 10 km Classic winner:  David Norris
 Women's 10 km Classic winner:  Caitlin Patterson
 Men's 1.4 km Freestyle winner:  David Norris
 Women's 1.4 km Freestyle winner:  Kelsey Phinney
 February 6 & 7: US Super Tour #4 in  Craftsbury
 Men's 10 km Classic winner:  Patrick Caldwell
 Women's 10 km winner  Annie Hart
 Men's 10 km Freestyle winner:  Kris Freeman
 Women's 5 km Freestyle winner:  Erika Flowers

Scandinavian Cup 2015–2016
 December 11–13, 2015: Scandinavian Cup #1 in  Vuokatti
 Women's 10 km Classics winner:  Sofia Henriksson
 Men's 15 km Classics winner:  Emil Iversen
 Women's 1,2 km Sprint Freestyle winner:  Maja Dahlqvist
 Men's 1,2 km Sprint Freestyle winner:  Oskar Svensson
 Women's 10 km Freestyle winner:  Maria Strøm Nakstad
 Men's 15 km Freestyle winner:  Martin Løwstrøm Nyenget
 January 8–10, 2016: Scandinavian Cup #2 in  Östersund
 Women's 10 km Freestyle winner:  Maria Strøm Nakstad
 Men's 15 km Freestyle winner:  Per Kristian Nygård
 Women's 20 km Classics winner:  Sofia Henriksson
 Men's 30 km Classics winner:  Mikael Gunnulfsen

North American Cup 2015–2016
 December 5–8, 2015: North American Cup #1 in  Canmore
 Women's 5 km Classics winner:  Sophie Carrier-Laforte
 Men's 10 km Classics winner:  Kevin Sandau
 Women's 10 km Freestyle Mass Start winner:  Dahria Beatty
 Women's 15 km Freestyle Mass Start winner:  Kevin Sandau
 Women's 1.5 km Classics winner:  Dahria Beatty
 Men's 1.5 km Classics winner:  Bob Thompson
 December 12 & 13, 2015: North American Cup #2 in  Vernon
 Women's 1,5 km Sprint Freestyle winner:  Maya MacIsaac-Jones
 Men's 1,2 km Sprint Freestyle winner:  Andy Shields
 Women's 10 km Freestyle winner:  Dahria Beatty
 Men's 15 km Freestyle winner:  Kevin Sandau
 January 14 & 17, 2016: North American Cup #3 in  Kaministiquia
 Women's 10 km Classics winner:  Andrea Dupont
 Men's 15 km Classics winner:  Kevin Sandau
 Women's 1,4 km Sprint Freestyle winner:  Andrea Dupont
 Men's 1,4 km Sprint Freestyle winner:  Julien Locke
 January 30 & 31, 2016: North American Cup #4 in  Mont-Sainte-Anne
 Men's 10 km Classics winner:  Bob Thompson
 Women's 5 km Classics winner:  Cendrine Browne
 Men's 15 km Freestyle Pursuit winner:  Andy Shields
 Women's 10 km Freestyle Pursuit winner:  Cendrine Browne
 February 5 – 7, 2016: North American Cup #5 in  Nakkertok Nordic Ski Centre
 Women's 1,4 km Sprint Freestyle winner:  Maya MacIsaac-Jones
 Men's 1,5 km Sprint Freestyle winner:  Julien Locke
 Women's 10 km Freestyle winner:  Cendrine Browne
 Men's 15 km Freestyle winner:  Michael Somppi
 Women's 15 km Classics winner:  Dahria Beatty
 Men's 20 km Classics winner:  Andy Shields
 February 19 – 21, 2016: North American Cup #6 in  Otway Nordic Ski Centre
 Women's 1.4 km Sprint Classic winner:  Dahria Beatty
 Men's 1.5 km Sprint Classic winner:  Bob Thompson
 Women's 7.5 km Free winner:  Dahria Beatty
 Men's 10 km Free winner:  Kennedy Russell
 Women's 15 km Classics winner:  Cendrine Browne
 Men's 20 km Classics winner:  Evan Palmer-Charrette

Slavic Cup 2015–2016
 December 12 & 13, 2015: Slavic Cup #1 in  Štrbské Pleso
 Women's 1,4 km Sprint Freestyle winner:  Marcela Marcisz-Niemczycka
 Men's 1.6 km Sprint Freestyle winner:  Jan Barton
 Women's 5 km Classics winner:  Marcela Marcisz-Niemczycka
 Men's 10 km Classics winner:  Andrej Segeč
 January 9 & 10, 2016: Slavic Cup #2 in  Štrbské Pleso
 Women's 5 km Classics winner:  Barbora Klementová
 Men's 10 km Classics winner:  Peter Mlynár
 Women's 10 km Freestyle winner:  Martyna Galewicz
 Men's 15 km Freestyle winner:  Peter Mlynár
 February 13 & 14, 2016: Slavic Cup #3 in  Harrachov
 This event was cancelled
 February 27 & 28, 2016: Slavic Cup #4 in  Kremnica
 Women's 1.3 km Freestyle winner:  Sandra Schuetzova
 Men's 1.5 km Freestyle winner:  Dušan Kožíšek
 Women's 10 km Classics winner:  Sandra Schuetzova
 Men's 15 km Classics winner:  Peter Mlynár

Alpen Cup 2015–2016
 December 12 & 13, 2015: Alpen Cup #1 in  Prémanon
 Women's 10 km Freestyle winner:  Nathalie Schwarz
 Men's 15 km Freestyle winner:  Giandomenico Salvadori
 Women's 10 km Classics winner:  Julia Belger
 Men's 15 km Classics winner:  Alexander Bessmertnykh
 December 18 – 20, 2015: Alpen Cup #2 in  Hochfilzen
 Women's 1.2 km Sprint free winner:  Anne Winkler
 Men's 1.4 km Sprint free winner:  Nikita Kriukov
 Women's 10 km Freestyle winner:  Coraline Hugue
 Men's 15 km Freestyle winner:  Giandomenico Salvadori
 Women's 10 km Classics winner:  Anouk Faivre-Picon
 Men's 15 km Classics winner:  Yevgeny Dementyev
 January 8 – 10, 2016: Alpen Cup #3 in  Planica
 Women's 10 km Classics winner:  Victoria Carl
 Men's 15 km Classics winner:  Alexis Jeannerod
 Women's 1.2 km Freestyle winner:  Antonia Fraebel
 Men's 1.4 km Freestyle winner:  Baptiste Gros
 Women's 10 km Freestyle winner:  Giulia Stuerz
 Men's 15 km Freestyle winner:  Clément Parisse
 February 5 – 7: Alpen Cup #4 in  Campra
 Men's 1,4 km Sprint Classic winner:  Giandomenico Salvadori
 Women's 1,2 km Sprint Classic winner:  Tatjana Stiffler
 Men's 15 km Freestyle winner:  Roman Furger
 Women's 10 km Freestyle winner:  Monique Siegel
 Men's 15 km Pursuit Classic winner:  Giandomenico Salvadori
 Women's 10 km Pursuit Classic winner:  Laura Gimmler

Far East Cup 2015–2016
 December 16 & 17, 2015: Far East Cup #1 in  Alpensia Resort
 Women's 5 km Classics winner:  Chisa Obayashi 
 Women's 5 km Freestyle winner:  Sumiko Ishigaki
 Men's 7,5 km Classics winner:  Takanori Ebina
 Men's 7,5 km Freestyle winner:  Takanori Ebina
 December 25 – 27, 2015: Far East Cup #2 in  Otoineppu
 Women's 5 km Classics winner:  Masako Ishida
 Men's 10 km Classics winner:  Keishin Yoshida
 Women's 5 km Freestyle winner:  Masako Ishida
 Men's 10 km Freestyle winner:  Jun Ishikawa
 January 6 – 8, 2016: Far East Cup #3 in  Sapporo
 Women's 5 km Classics winner:  Yuki Kobayashi
 Men's 10 km Classics winner:  Keishin Yoshida
 Women's 10 km Freestyle winner:  Yuki Kobayashi
 Men's 15 km Freestyle winner:  Akira Lenting
 January 26 & 27, 2016: Far East Cup #4 in  Alpensia Resort
 Women's 5 km Classics winner:  Da-Som Han
 Men's 10 km Classics winner:  Akira Lenting
 Women's 10 km Freestyle winner:  Hye-Ri Ju
 Men's 15 km Classics winner:  Akira Lenting

Balkan Cup 2016
 January 19 & 20: Balkan Cup #1 in  Gerede
 Women's 5 km Classic winner:  Vedrana Malec
 Men's 5 km Classic winner:  Paul Constantin Pepene
 Women's 5 km Freestyle winner:  Vedrana Malec
 Women's 10 km Freestyle winner:  Paul Constantin Pepene
 January 26 & 27: Balkan Cup #2 in  Zlatibor
 Event cancelled
 February 6 & 7: Balkan Cup #3 in  Ravna Gora
 Event cancelled
 February 27 & 28: Balkan Cup #4 in  Pigadia
 Event cancelled
 February 27 & 28: Balkan Cup #5 in  Ravna Gora
 Women's 5 km Freestyle winner:  Vedrana Malec
 Men's 10 km Freestyle winner:  Krešimir Crnkovic
 Women's 10 km Freestyle winner:  Vedrana Malec
 Men's 15 km Freestyle winner:  Krešimir Crnkovic

2015–16 IPC Cross-Country Skiing World Cup
 December 2 – 9, 2015: IPC CC World Cup #1 in  Tyumen

 For results, click here.
 February 21 – 28: IPC CC World Cup #2 in  Finsterau
 For results, click here.
 March 15 – 20:  IPC CC World Cup #3 (final) in  Vuokatti
 For results, click here.

Freestyle skiing

2016 Winter Youth Olympics (FS)
 February 14 – 20: 2016 Winter Youth Olympics in  Lillehammer
 Boy's Halfpipe winners:   Birk Irving;   Finn Bilous;   Trym Sunde Andreassen
 Boy's Slopestyle winners:   Birk Ruud;   Alexander Hall;   Finn Bilous
 Boy's Ski Cross winners:   Reece Howden;   Xander Vercammen;   Louis Muhlen
 Girl's Halfpipe winners:   Madison Rowlands;   Paula Cooper;   Lara Wolf
 Girl's Slopestyle winners:   Lana Prusakova;   Lou Barin;   Madison Rowlands
 Girl's Ski Cross winners:   Talina Gantenbein;   Zali Offord;   Klára Kašparová

Mogul skiing and Aerials
 December 12, 2015: FIS MS&A World Cup #1 in  Rukatunturi, Kuusamo
 Men's Dual Moguls winner:  Mikaël Kingsbury
 Women's Dual Moguls winner:  Mikaela Matthews
 December 19 & 20, 2015: FIS MS&A World Cup #2 in  Beijing
 Men's Aerials #1 winner:  Qi Guangpu
 Men's Aerials #2 winner:  Maxim Gustik
 Women's Aerials #1 winner:  Ashley Caldwell
 Women's Aerials #2 winner:  Kong Fanyu
 January 14 – 16: FIS MS&A World Cup #3 in  Lake Placid, New York
 Events cancelled.
 January 23: FIS MS&A World Cup #4 in  Val Saint-Côme, Quebec
 Men's Moguls winner:  Mikaël Kingsbury
 Women's Moguls winner:  Justine Dufour-Lapointe
 January 30: FIS MS&A World Cup #5 in  Calgary
 Men's Moguls winner:  Mikaël Kingsbury
 Women's Moguls winner:  Chloé Dufour-Lapointe
 February 4 – 6: FIS MS&A World Cup #6 in  Deer Valley
 Men's Aerials #1 winner:  Qi Guangpu
 Men's Aerials #2 winner:  Petr Medulich
 Women's Aerials #1 winner:  YANG Yu
 Women's Aerials #2 winner:  Zhang Xin
 Men's Moguls winner:  Matt Graham
 Women's Moguls winner:  Justine Dufour-Lapointe
 Men's Dual Moguls winner:  Anthony Benna
 Women's Dual Moguls winner:  Justine Dufour-Lapointe
 February 13: FIS MS&A World Cup #7 in  Moscow #1
 Men's Aerials winner:  Mac Bohonnon
 Women's Aerials winner:  Alina Gridneva
 February 20: FIS MS&A World Cup #8 in  Minsk
 Men's Aerials winner:  Christopher Lillis
 Women's Aerials winner:  Ashley Caldwell
 February 27: FIS MS&A World Cup #9 in  Sierra Nevada Ski Station
 Events cancelled.
 February 27 & 28: FIS MS&A World Cup #10 in  Lake Tazawa, Semboku, Akita
 Men's Moguls winner:  Bradley Wilson
 Women's Moguls winner:  Perrine Laffont
 Men's Dual Moguls winner:  Mikaël Kingsbury
 Women's Dual Moguls winner:  Deborah Scanzio
 March 5: FIS MS&A World Cup #11 (final) in  Moscow #2
 Men's Dual Moguls winner:  Mikaël Kingsbury
 Women's Dual Moguls winner:  Perrine Laffont

Half-pipe skiing and Slopestyle
 August 21, 23, 27, and 29, 2015: FIS HP&S World Cup #1 in  Cardrona Alpine Resort
 Men's Halfpipe winner:  Kevin Rolland
 Women's Halfpipe winner:  Devin Logan
 Men's Slopestyle winner:  James Woods
 Women's Slopestyle winner:  Tiril Sjåstad Christiansen
 January 21 – 24: FIS HP&S World Cup #2 in  Mammoth Mountain Ski Area
 Men's Halfpipe winner:  Gus Kenworthy
 Women's Halfpipe winner:  Ayana Onozuka
 Men's Slopestyle winner:  Joss Christensen
 Women's Slopestyle winner:  Yuki Tsubota
 February 3 & 5: FIS HP&S World Cup #3 in  Park City Mountain Resort
 Men's Halfpipe winner:  Aaron Blunck
 Women's Halfpipe winner:  Maddie Bowman
 February 12: FIS HP&S World Cup #4 in  Boston
 Men's Big Air winner:  Vincent Gagnier
 Women's Big Air winner:  Lisa Zimmermann
 February 18 & 20: FIS HP&S World Cup #5 in  Bokwang Phoenix Park
 Men's Slopestyle winner:  Alex Bellemare
 Women's Slopestyle winner:  Tiril Sjåstad Christiansen
 March 3 & 4: FIS HP&S World Cup #6 in  Silvaplana
 Men's Slopestyle winner:  Andri Ragettli
 Women's Slopestyle winner:  Emma Dahlström
 March 9 & 10: FIS HP&S World Cup #7 (final) in  Tignes
 Men's Halfpipe winner:  Kevin Rolland
 Women's Halfpipe winner:  Maddie Bowman

Ski cross
 December 4 & 5, 2015: FIS SC World Cup #1 in  Montafon
 Men's Ski Cross winner:  Christopher Del Bosco
 Women's Ski Cross winner:  Marielle Thompson
 December 10 – 12, 2015: FIS SC World Cup #2 in  Val Thorens
 Men's Ski Cross #1 winner:  Christopher Del Bosco
 Men's Ski Cross #2 winner:  Jean-Frédéric Chapuis
 Women's Ski Cross #1 winner:  Anna Holmlund
 Women's Ski Cross #2 winner:  Anna Holmlund
 December 18 – 20, 2015: FIS SC World Cup #3 in  Innichen
 Men's Ski Cross #1 winner:  Jean-Frédéric Chapuis
 Men's Ski Cross #2 winner:  Victor Öhling Norberg
 Women's Ski Cross #1 winner:  Heidi Zacher
 Women's Ski Cross #2 winner:  Andrea Limbacher
 January 9 & 10: FIS SC World Cup #4 in  Watles
 Events cancelled.
 January 15 – 17: FIS SC World Cup #5 in  Watles
 Note: This event was slated for La Plagne, but was cancelled and replaced with Watles.
 Men's Ski Cross #1 winner:  Jean-Frédéric Chapuis
 Men's Ski Cross #2 winner:  Jonas Lenherr
 Women's Ski Cross #1 winner:  Anna Holmlund
 Women's Ski Cross #2 winner:  Marielle Thompson
 January 22 & 23: FIS SC World Cup #6 in  Nakiska
 Men's Ski Cross winner:  Jean-Frédéric Chapuis
 Women's Ski Cross winner:  Marielle Thompson
 February 12 – 14: FIS SC World Cup #7 in  Idre
 Men's Ski Cross #1 winner:  Filip Flisar
 Men's Ski Cross #2 winner:  Victor Öhling Norberg
 Women's Ski Cross #1 winner:  Anna Holmlund
 Women's Ski Cross #2 winner:  Marielle Thompson
 February 19 – 21: FIS SC World Cup #8 in  Tegernsee
 Events cancelled.
 February 26 & 28: FIS SC World Cup #9 in  Bokwang Phoenix Park
 Men's Ski Cross winner:  Bastien Midol
 Women's Ski Cross winner:  Andrea Limbacher
 March 4: FIS SC World Cup #10 (final) in  Arosa
 Men's Ski Cross winner:  Semen Denshchikov
 Women's Ski Cross winner:  Anna Holmlund
 March 11 & 13: FIS SC World Cup #11 in  Squaw Valley Ski Resort
 Events cancelled.

Europa Cup 2015–2016
 November 21 & 22, 2015: FIS Europa Cup #1 in  Pitztal
 Men's Ski Cross #1 winner:  Louis-Pierre Hélie
 Men's Ski Cross #2 winner:  Kevin Drury
 Women's Ski Cross #1 winner:  Kelsey Serwa
 Women's Ski Cross #2 winner:  Kelsey Serwa
 November 28, 2015: FIS Europa Cup #2 in  Kaunertal
 This stage was cancelled
 December 4 & 5, 2015: FIS Europa Cup #3 in  Rukatunturi
 Men's Aerials #1 winner:  Olivier Rochon
 Men's Aerials #2 winner:  Pavel Krotov
 Women's Aerials #1 winner:  Alina Gridneva
 Women's Aerials #2 winner:  Danielle Scott
 December 17 & 18, 2015: FIS Europa Cup #4 in  Val Thorens
 Men's Ski Cross #1 winner:  Ryan Regez
 Men's Ski Cross #2 winner:  Ryan Regez
 Women's Ski Cross #1 winner:  Ekaterina Maltseva
 Women's Ski Cross #2 winner:  Nina Kloe
 January 23 & 24, 2016: FIS Europa Cup #5 in  Albiez-Montrond
 Men's Moguls winner:  Walter Wallberg
 Women's Moguls winner:  Nicole Gasparini
 Men's Dual Moguls winner:  Walter Wallberg
 Women's Dual Moguls winner:  Nicole Gasparini
 January 28 & 29, 2016: FIS Europa Cup #7 in  Albiez-Montrond
 Men's Moguls winner:  Walter Wallberg
 Women's Moguls winner:  Ksenia Kuznetsova
 Men's Dual Moguls winner:  Dmitriy Barmashov
 Women's Dual Moguls winner:  Anastasia Pervushina
 January 28 & 29, 2016: FIS Europa Cup #8 in  Lenk im Simmental
 Men's Ski Cross #1 winner:  Adam Kappacher
 Men's Ski Cross #2 winner:  Stefan Thanei
 Women's Ski Cross #1 winner:  Katrin Müller
 Women's Ski Cross #2 winner:  Katrin Müller
 January 29 – 31, 2016: FIS Europa Cup #9 in  Minsk
 Men's Ski Cross #1 winner:  Nicolas Gygax
 Men's Ski Cross #2 winner:  Nicolas Gygax
 Women's Ski Cross #1 winner:  Kristina Spiridonova
 Women's Ski Cross #2 winner:  Zhanbota Aldabergenova
 Men's Team winner:  (Radmir Gareev, Ruslan Katmanov, Kristina Spiridonova)
 Women's Team winners: 
 February 4 & 5, 2016: FIS Europa Cup #10 in  Chiesa in Valmalenco
 Men's Moguls #1 winner:  Walter Wallberg
 Men's Moguls #2 winner:  Sergey Volkov
 Women's Moguls #1 winner:  Yelizaveta Bezgodova
 Women's Moguls #2 winner:  Nora Lodoen
 February 4 – 6, 2016: FIS Europa Cup #11 in  Orcières
 Men's Ski Cross #1 winner:  Tristan Tafel
 Men's Ski Cross #2 winner:  Tristan Tafel
 Women's Ski Cross #1 winner:  Yulia Livinskaya
 Women's Ski Cross #2 winner:  Sabine Wolfsgruber
 February 12 – 13, 2016: FIS Europa Cup #12 in  Sankt Gallenkirch
 Men's Moguls #1 winner:  Andrey Uglovski
 Men's Moguls #2 winner:  Sergey Volkov
 Women's Moguls #1 winner:  Melanie Meilinger
 Women's Moguls #2 winner:  Nicole Gasparini
 February 27 – 28, 2016: FIS Europa Cup #13 in  Seiser Alm
 Men's Slopestyle #1 winner:  Florian Preuss
 Men's Slopestyle #2 winner:  Finn Bilous
 Women's Slopestyle #1 winner:  Zuzana Stromková
 Women's Slopestyle #2 winner:  Dominique Ohaco
 February 27 – 28, 2016: FIS Europa Cup #14 in  Grasgehren
 Men's Ski Cross #1 winner:  Joos Berry
 Men's Ski Cross #1 winner:  Florian Wilmsmann
 Women's Ski Cross #1 winner:  Katrin Müller
 Women's Ski Cross #2 winner:  Katrin Müller

North American Cup 2015–2016
 December 18 & 19, 2015: North American Cup #1 in  Utah Olympic Park
 Men's Aerials #1 winner:  Harrison Smith
 Men's Aerials #1 winner:  Christopher Lillis
 Women's Aerials #1 winner:  Tyra Izor
 Women's Aerials #2 winner:  Winter Vinecki
 January 15 – 17, 2016: North American Cup #2 in  Taber
 Women's Ski Cross #1 winner:  Tiana Gairns
 Women's Ski Cross #2 winner:  Tiana Gairns
 Men's Ski Cross #1 winner:  Mathieu Leduc
 Men's Ski Cross #2 winner:  Trent McCarthy
 January 25 – 27, 2016: North American Cup #3 in  Nakiska
 Women's Ski Cross #1 winner:  Brittany Phelan
 Women's Ski Cross #2 winner:  Brittany Phelan
 Men's Ski Cross #1 winner:  Kris Mahler
 Men's Ski Cross #2 winner:  Kevin Drury
 February 13 & 14, 2016: North American Cup #4 in  Lake Placid, New York
 Men's Aerials #1 winner:  Lewis Irving
 Men's Aerials #2 winner:  Justin Schoenefeld
 Women's Aerials #1 winner:  Catrine Lavallee
 Women's Aerials #2 winner:  Catrine Lavallee
 February 13 & 14, 2016: North American Cup #5 in  Canada Olympic Park
 Women's Moguls winner:  Sophia Schwartz
 Men's Moguls winner:  Joel Hedrick
 Women's Dual Moguls winner:  Tess Johnson
 Men's Dual Moguls winner:  Emerson Smith
 February 17 – 21, 2016: North American Cup #6 in  Ski Cooper
 Men's Ski Cross #1 winner:  Zach Belczyk
 Men's Ski Cross #2 winner:  Zach Belczyk
 Women's ski Cross #1 winner:  Mara White
 Women's ski Cross #2 winner:  Leah Emaus
 February 18 – 20, 2016: North American Cup #7 in  Buttermilk
 Men's Slopestyle winner:  Ethan Swadburg
 Women's Slopestyle winner:  Nadia Gonzales
 Men's Big Air winner:  Taylor Wilson
 Women's Big Air here is cancelled
 Men's Halfpipe winner:  Byron Wells
 Women's Halfpipe winner:  Carly Margulies
 February 20 & 21, 2016: North American Cup #8 in  Park City Mountain Resort
 Men's Moguls winner:  Emerson Smith
 Men's Dual Moguls winner:  Joel Hedrick
 Women's Moguls winner:  Tess Johnson
 Women's Dual Moguls winner:  Taylah O'Neill
 February 27 & 28, 2016: North American Cup #9 in  Val Saint-Côme
 Men's Aerials #1 winner:  Christopher Lillis
 Men's Aerials #2 winner:  Lewis Irving
 Women's Aerials #1 winner:  Catrine Lavallee
 Women's Aerials #2 winner:  Winter Vinecki
 Men's Moguls winner:  Troy Tully
 Women's Moguls winner:  Julie Bergeron
 Men's Dual Moguls winner:  Emerson Smith
 Women's Dual Moguls winner:  Kaitlyn Harrell
 February 27 & 28, 2016: North American Cup #10 in  Canada Olympic Park
 Men's Halfpipe winner:  Nico Porteous
 Men's Slopestyle winner:  Nico Porteous
 Women's Halfpipe winner:  Jamie Crane-Mauzy
 Women's Slopestyle winner:  Elena Gaskell

Oceania Continental Cup
 July 25 & 26: Oceania Continental Cup #1 in  Cardrona Alpine Resort
 Men's Slopestyle winner:  Beau-James Wells
 Women's Slopestyle winner:  Keri Herman
 Men's Halfpipe winner:  Beau-James Wells
 Women's Halfpipe winner:  Keri Herman
 August 1 – 3: Oceania Continental Cup #2 in  Mount Hotham
 Men's Ski Cross winner:  Anton Grimus
 Women's Ski Cross winner:  Katya Crema
 September 1 & 2: Oceania Continental Cup #3 in  Mount Hotham
 Women's Ski Cross winner:  Sami Kennedy-Sim
 Men's Ski Cross winner:  Anton Grimus
 Women's Ski Cross winner:  Kelsey Serwa
 Men's Ski Cross winner:  Brady Leman
 September 1 & 2: Oceania Continental Cup #4 in  Perisher Ski Resort
 Women's Moguls winner:  Britteny Cox
 Men's Moguls winner:  Mikaël Kingsbury
 Women's Moguls winner:  Junko Hoshino
 Men's Moguls winner:  Mikaël Kingsbury
 September 5: Oceania Continental Cup #5 in  Mount Buller
 Women's Dual Moguls winner:  Britteny Cox
 Men's Dual Moguls winner:  Benjamin Cavet

South American Continental Cup
 August 30 – September 1: South American Continental Cup #1 in  Antillanca ski resort
 Women's Ski Cross winner:  Tania Prymak
 Men's Ski Cross winner:  Sergey Ridzik
 Women's Ski Cross winner:  Tania Prymak
 Women's Ski Cross winner:  Roman Ilin
 September 10 – 12: South American Continental Cup #2 in  El Colorado Ski Center
 Men's Big Air winner:  Matías Muñoz
 Women's Big Air winner:  Dominique Ohaco
 Men's Big Air winner:  Vincent Haller

Nordic combined

2016 Winter Youth Olympics (NC) and World Championships
 February 16 & 20: 2016 Winter Youth Olympics in  Lillehammer
 Boy's individual winners:   Tim Kopp;   Ben Loomis;   Ondřej Pažout
 Nordic Mixed Team winners:  ;  ;  
 February 22 – 28: 2016 FIS Nordic Junior World Ski Championships in  Râșnov
 Men's individual #1 winner:  Bernhard Flaschberger
 Men's individual #2 winner:  Tomáš Portyk
 Men's team winners:  (Florian Dagn, Noa Ian Mraz, Samuel Mraz, Bernhard Flaschberger)

2015–16 FIS Nordic Combined World Cup
 August 29 & 30, 2015: FIS NC World Cup #1 in  Oberwiesenthal
 Winner:  Eric Frenzel
 Team winners:  (Harald Lemmerer & Bernhard Gruber)
 September 2, 2015: FIS NC World Cup #2 in  Tschagguns / Partenen
 Winner:  Mario Seidl
 September 4 & 5, 2015: FIS NC World Cup #3 in  Oberstdorf
 Winner #1:  Johannes Rydzek
 Winner #2:  Fabian Rießle
 November 28 & 29, 2015: FIS NC World Cup #4 in  Rukatunturi, Kuusamo
 Events cancelled.
 December 5 & 6, 2015: FIS NC World Cup #5 in  Lillehammer
 Winner #1:  Fabian Rießle
 Winner #2:  Magnus Krog
 December 19 & 20, 2015: FIS NC World Cup #6 in  Ramsau am Dachstein
 Winner #1:  Magnus Moan
 Winner #2:  Eric Frenzel
 January 2 & 3: FIS NC World Cup #7 in  Klingenthal
 Events cancelled.
 January 23 & 24: FIS NC World Cup #8 in  Chaux-Neuve
 Winner #1:  Eric Frenzel
 Winner #2:  Fabian Rießle
 January 29 – 31: FIS NC World Cup #9 in  Seefeld in Tirol
 Winner #1:  Eric Frenzel
 Winner #2:  Eric Frenzel
 Winner #3:  Eric Frenzel
 February 6: FIS NC World Cup #10 in  Oslo
 Winner:  Jarl Magnus Riiber
 February 9 & 10: FIS NC World Cup #11 in  Trondheim
 Winner #1:  Jørgen Graabak
 Winner #2:  Eric Frenzel
 February 19 – 21: FIS NC World Cup #12 in  Lahti
 Winner #1:  Eric Frenzel
 Winner #2:  Fabian Rießle
 Team winners:  (Johannes Rydzek, Fabian Rießle)
 February 23: FIS NC World Cup #13 in  Kuopio
 Winner:  Johannes Rydzek
 February 26 – 28: FIS NC World Cup #14 in  Fiemme Valley
 Winner #1:  Bernhard Gruber
 Winner #2:  Magnus Krog
 Team winners:  (Magnus Krog, Jørgen Graabak)
 March 4 – 6: FIS NC World Cup #15 (final) in  Schonach
 Winner #1:  Eric Frenzel
 Winner #2:  Jørgen Graabak
 Team winners:  (Magnus Moan, Jan Schmid, Magnus Krog, Jørgen Graabak)

Nordic Combined FIS Continental Cup 2015–2016

 December 11–13, 2015: FIS Continental Cup #1 in  Soldier Hollow
 Winner #1:  David Pommer
 Winner #2:  David Pommer
 Winner #3:  Taylor Fletcher
 December 15–16: FIS Continental Cup #2 in  Lake Placid
 This stage was cancelled
 January 8–10: FIS Continental Cup #3 in  Hoeydalsmo
 One event in this stage cancelled
 Winner #2:  Espen Andersen
 Winner #3:  Franz-Josef Rehrl
 January 15–17: FIS Continental Cup #4 in  Rukatunturi
 Winner #1:  Ilkka Herola
 Winner #2:  Ilkka Herola
 January 23 & 24: FIS Continental Cup #5 in  Pyeongchang
 Winner #1:  Harald Lemmerer
 Winner #2:  Tobias Simon
 February 6 & 7: FIS Continental Cup #6 in  Planica
 Winner #1:  Lukas Greiderer
 Winner #2:  Bernhard Flaschberger
 February 13 & 14: FIS Continental Cup #7 in  Ramsau am Dachstein
 Winner #1:  Vinzenz Geiger
 Winner #2:  Vinzenz Geiger

Alpen Cup 2015–2016
 August 10, 2015: Alpen Cup #1 in  Klingenthal
 Women's Individual winner:  Lisa Eder
 September 12 & 13, 2015: Alpen Cup #2 in  Winterberg
 Men's Individual winner:  Vinzenz Geiger
 Men's Individual winner:  Terence Weber
 September 26 & 27, 2015: Alpen Cup #3 in  Hinterzarten
 Men's Individual winner:  Laurent Muhlethaler
 Men's Individual winner:  Laurent Muhlethaler
 December 19 & 20, 2015: Alpen Cup #4 in  Seefeld in Tirol
 Men's Individual winner  Vinzenz Geiger
 December 19 & 20, 2015: Alpen Cup #5 in  Villach
 Events for this stage cancelled
 January 15 & 17, 2016: Alpen Cup #4 in  Oberwiesenthal
 Men's Individual winner  Anton Schlütter
 Men's Individual winner  Stefan Hauser
 February 13 & 14, 2016: Alpen Cup #5 in  Planica
 Men's Individual winner  Mika Vermeulen
 Men's Individual winner  Laurent Muhlethaler

Ski jumping

2016 Winter Youth Olympics (SJ) and World Championships
 February 16 – 18: 2016 Winter Youth Olympics in  Lillehammer
 Boy's winners:   Bor Pavlovčič;   Marius Lindvik;   Jonathan Siegel
 Girl's winners:   Ema Klinec;   Sofia Tikhonova;   Lara Malsiner
 Mixed Team winners:  ;  ;  
 February 22 – 28: FIS Nordic Junior World Ski Championships in  Râșnov
 Men's Individual winner:  David Siegel
 Women's Individual winner:  Chiara Hölzl
 Men's Team winners:  (Jonathan Siegel, Adrian Sell, Tim Fuchs, David Siegel)
 Mixed Team winners:  (Nika Križnar, Bor Pavlovčič, Ema Klinec, Domen Prevc)

2015–16 Four Hills Tournament
 December 28 & 29, 2015: FHT #1 in  Oberstdorf
 Men's individual winner:  Severin Freund
 December 31, 2015 & January 1, 2016: FHT #2 in  Garmisch-Partenkirchen
 Men's individual winner:  Peter Prevc
 January 2 & 3: FHT #3 in  Innsbruck
 Men's individual winner:  Peter Prevc
 January 5 & 6: FHT #4 (final) in  Bischofshofen
 Men's individual winner:  Peter Prevc

FIS Ski Flying World Championships
 January 14 – 17: FIS Ski Flying World Championships 2016 in  Tauplitz–Bad Mitterndorf
 Men's individual winner:  Peter Prevc
 Men's Team Flying Hill winners:  (Anders Fannemel, Johann André Forfang, Daniel-André Tande, Kenneth Gangnes)

2015–16 FIS Ski Jumping World Cup
 July
 July 30 – August 1, 2015: FIS SJ World Cup #1 in  Wisła #1
 Men's individual winner:  Dawid Kubacki
 Men's team winners:  (Maciej Kot, Piotr Żyła, Dawid Kubacki, Kamil Stoch)
 August
 August 6 – 8, 2015: FIS SJ World Cup #2 in  Hinterzarten
 Men's individual winner:  Dawid Kubacki
 Men's team winners:  (Severin Freund, Stephan Leyhe, Andreas Wellinger, Andreas Wank)
 August 13 & 14, 2015: FIS SJ World Cup #3 in  Courchevel
 Men's individual winner:  Severin Freund
 Women's individual winner:  Sara Takanashi
 August 15, 2015: FIS SJ World Cup #4 in  Einsiedeln
 Men's individual winner:  Severin Freund
 August 28 – 30, 2015: FIS SJ World Cup #5 in  Hakuba, Nagano
 Men's individual winner #1:  Michael Neumayer
 Men's individual winner #2:  Kento Sakuyama
 September
 September 4 – 6, 2015: FIS SJ World Cup #6 in  Chaykovsky, Perm Krai
 Men's individual winner #1:  Kenneth Gangnes
 Men's individual winner #2:  Kenneth Gangnes
 Women's individual winner #1:  Sara Takanashi
 Women's individual winner #2:  Sara Takanashi
 September 11 – 13, 2015: FIS SJ World Cup #7 in  Almaty
 Men's individual winner #1:  Stefan Kraft
 Men's individual winner #2:  Junshirō Kobayashi
 Women's individual winner #1:  Sara Takanashi
 Women's individual winner #2:  Sara Takanashi
 September 26 & 27, 2015: FIS SJ World Cup #8 in  Hinzenbach #1
 Men's individual winner:  Gregor Schlierenzauer
 November
 Note: The training and qualification events on November 20 were postponed to November 21.
 November 21 & 22, 2015: FIS SJ World Cup #9 in  Klingenthal
 Men's team winners:  (Andreas Wellinger, Andreas Wank, Richard Freitag, Severin Freund)
 Men's individual winner:  Daniel-André Tande
 November 26 – 28, 2015: FIS SJ World Cup #10 in  Rukatunturi, Kuusamo
 Events canceled, due to windy conditions.
 December
 December 4 – 6, 2015: FIS SJ World Cup #11 in  Lillehammer
 Men's individual winner #1:  Severin Freund
 Men's individual winner #2:  Kenneth Gangnes
 Women's individual winner:  Sara Takanashi
 December 11 – 13, 2015: FIS SJ World Cup #12 in  Nizhny Tagil
 Men's individual #1 winner:  Severin Freund
 Men's individual #2 winner:  Peter Prevc
 Women's individual #1 winner:  Sara Takanashi
 Women's individual #2 winner:  Daniela Iraschko-Stolz
 December 18 – 20, 2015: FIS SJ World Cup #13 in  Engelberg
 Men's individual #1 winner:  Peter Prevc
 Men's individual #2 winner:  Peter Prevc
 January
 January 8 – 10: FIS SJ World Cup #14 in  Willingen
 Men's individual winner:  Peter Prevc
 Men's team winners:  (Andreas Wellinger, Andreas Wank, Richard Freitag, Severin Freund)
 January 16 & 17: FIS SJ World Cup #15 in  Sapporo #1
 Women's individual winner #1:  Sara Takanashi
 Women's individual winner #2:  Sara Takanashi
 January 22 & 23: FIS SJ World Cup #16 in  Zaō, Miyagi
 Women's individual winner #1:  Sara Takanashi
 Women's individual winner #2:  Sara Takanashi
 January 22 – 24: FIS SJ World Cup #17 in  Zakopane
 Men's individual winner:  Stefan Kraft
 Men's team winners:  (Anders Fannemel, Andreas Stjernen, Daniel-André Tande, Kenneth Gangnes)
 January 29 – 31: FIS SJ World Cup #18 in  Sapporo #2
 Men's individual winner #1:  Peter Prevc
 Men's individual winner #2:  Anders Fannemel
 January 30 & 31: FIS SJ World Cup #19 in  Oberstdorf
 Women's individual winner #1:  Sara Takanashi
 Women's individual winner #2:  Sara Takanashi
 February
 February 4 – 7: FIS SJ World Cup #20 in  Oslo
 Note: Men's individual event was cancelled.
 Men's team winners:  (Jurij Tepeš, Domen Prevc, Robert Kranjec, Peter Prevc)
 Women's individual winner:  Sara Takanashi
 February 6 & 7: FIS SJ World Cup #21 in  Hinzenbach #2
 Women's individual winner #1:  Sara Takanashi
 Women's individual winner #2:  Sara Takanashi
 February 9 & 10: FIS SJ World Cup #22 in  Trondheim
 Men's individual winner:  Peter Prevc
 February 12 – 14: FIS SJ World Cup #23 in  Vikersund
 Men's individual winner #1:  Robert Kranjec
 Men's individual winner #2:  Peter Prevc
 Men's individual winner #3:  Peter Prevc
 February 13 & 14: FIS SJ World Cup #24 in  Ljubno ob Savinji
 Women's individual winner #1:  Maja Vtič
 Women's individual winner #2:  Daniela Iraschko-Stolz
 February 19 – 21: FIS SJ World Cup #25 in  Lahti
 Note: The Men's Team event here cancelled.
 Men's individual winner #1:  Michael Hayböck
 Men's individual winner #2:  Michael Hayböck
 Women's individual winner:  Sara Takanashi
 February 22 & 23: FIS SJ World Cup #26 in  Kuopio
 Men's individual winner:  Michael Hayböck
 Men's team winners:  (Kenneth Gangnes, Daniel-André Tande, Anders Fannemel, Johann André Forfang)
 February 26 – 28: FIS SJ World Cup #27 in  Almaty
 Men's individual winner #1:  Peter Prevc
 Men's individual winner #2:  Peter Prevc
 Women's individual winner #1:  Sara Takanashi
 Women's individual winner #2:  Sara Takanashi
 March
 March 3 – 5: FIS SJ World Cup #28 in  Wisła #2
 Note: The second men's individual event was cancelled.
 Men's individual winner:  Roman Koudelka
 March 5 & 6: FIS SJ World Cup #29 in  Râșnov
 Events cancelled.
 March 11 – 13: FIS SJ World Cup #30 in  Titisee-Neustadt
 Note: The second men's individual event was cancelled.
 Men's individual winner:  Johann André Forfang
 March 17 – 20: FIS SJ World Cup #31 (final) in  Planica
 Men's individual winner #1:  Peter Prevc
 Men's individual winner #2:  Robert Kranjec
 Men's individual winner #3:  Peter Prevc
 Men's team winners:  (Daniel-André Tande, Anders Fannemel, Kenneth Gangnes, Johann André Forfang)

2015–16 FIS Ski Jumping Continental Cup

Summer
 July 4 – 5: FIS Continental Cup #1 in  Kranj
 Men's Individual winner:  Dawid Kubacki
 Men's Individual winner:  Dawid Kubacki
 August 8 – 9: FIS Continental Cup #2 in  Wisla 
 Men's Individual winner:  Joacim Ødegård Bjøreng
 Men's Individual winner:  Klemens Murańka
 August 22 – 23: FIS Continental Cup #3 in  Kuopio
 Men's Individual winner:  Florian Altenburger
 Men's Individual winner:  Andraž Pograjc
 August 28 – 29: FIS Continental Cup #4 in  Oberwiesenthal
 Women's Individual winner:  Ema Klinec
 Women's Individual winner:  Sara Takanashi
 August 28 – 29: FIS Continental Cup #5 in  Frenštát pod Radhoštěm
 Men's Individual winner:  Klemens Murańka
 Men's Individual winner:  Clemens Aigner
 September 12 – 13: FIS Continental Cup #6 in  Stams
 Men's Individual winner:  Daniel-André Tande
 Men's Individual winner:  Daniel-André Tande
 September 19 – 20: FIS Continental Cup #7 in  Oslo
 Women's Individual winner:  Maren Lundby
 Men's Individual winner:  Halvor Egner Granerud
 Women's Individual winner:  Line Jahr
 Men's Individual winner:  Daniel-André Tande
 October 3 – 4: FIS Continental Cup #8 in  Klingenthal
 Men's Individual winner:  Daniel-André Tande
 Men's Individual winner:  Domen Prevc

Winter
 December 11 – 12: FIS Continental Cup #1 in  Notodden
 Women's Individual winner:  Sabrina Windmüller
 Women's Individual winner:  Sabrina Windmüller
 December 11 – 13: FIS Continental Cup #2 in  Rena
 Men's Individual winner:  Andrzej Stękała
 Men's Individual winner:  Tilen Bartol
 Men's Individual winner:  Tilen Bartol
 December 19 & 20, 2015: FIS Continental Cup #3 in  Rovaniemi
 Men's Individual winner:  Karl Geiger
 Men's Individual winner:  David Siegel
 December 27 & 28: FIS Continental Cup #4 in  Engelberg
 Men's Individual winner:  Clemens Aigner
 Men's Individual winner:  Tom Hilde
 January 9 & 10: FIS Continental Cup #5 in  Garmisch-Partenkirchen
 Men's Individual winner:  David Siegel
 Men's Individual winner:  Thomas Hofer
 January 16 & 17: FIS Continental Cup #6 in  Willingen
 Men's Individual winner:  Florian Altenburger
 Men's Individual winner:  Thomas Hofer
 January 22 – 24: FIS Continental Cup #7 in  Sapporo
 Men's Individual winner:  Tomáš Vančura
 Men's Individual winner:  Tom Hilde
 Men's Individual winner:  Jaka Hvala
 January 30 & 31: FIS Continental Cup #8 in  Bischofshofen
 Men's Individual winner:  Karl Geiger
 Men's Individual winner:  Markus Eisenbichler
 February 6 & 7: FIS Continental Cup #9 in  Planica
 Men's Individual winner:  Philipp Aschenwald
 Men's Individual winner:  Philipp Aschenwald
 February 13 & 14: FIS Continental Cup #10 in  Zakopane
 Men's Individual winner:  Ulrich Wohlgenannt
 Men's Individual winner:  Ulrich Wohlgenannt
 February 20 & 21: FIS Continental Cup #11 in  Iron Mountain
 Men's Individual winner:  Mike Glasder
 Men's Individual winner:  Florian Altenburger
 February 27 & 28: FIS Continental Cup #12 in  Brotterode
 Men's Individual winner:  Bartłomiej Kłusek
 Men's Individual winner:

Alpen Cup 2015–2016
 December 19 & 20, 2015: Alpen Cup #1 in  Seefeld in Tirol
 Men's Individual winner:  Timi Zajc
 Men's Individual winner:  Jonathan Siegel
 December 19 & 20, 2015: Alpen Cup #2 in  Villach
 Events for this stage cancelled
 January 9 & 10, 2016: Alpen Cup #3 in  Žiri
 Women's Individual winner:  Lara Malsiner
 Women's Individual winner:  Nika Križnar
 January 15 & 17, 2016: Alpen Cup #4 in  Oberwiesenthal
 Men's winner #1:  Jonathan Siegel
 Men's winner #2:  Paul Brasme
 Women's winner #1:  Pauline Heßler
 Women's winner #2:  Agnes Reisch
 February 13 & 14, 2016: Alpen Cup #5 in  Planica
 Men's Individual winner:  Janni Reisenauer
 Men's Individual winner:  Janni Reisenauer

Snowboarding

2016 Winter Youth Olympics (SB)
 February 14 – 20: 2016 Winter Youth Olympics in  Lillehammer
 Boy's Halfpipe winners:   Jake Pates;   Nikolas Baden;   Tit Štante
 Boy's Slopestyle winners:   Jake Pates;   Vlad Khadarin;   Rene Rinnekangas
 Boy's Snowboard Cross winners:   Jake Vedder;   Alex Dickson;   Sebastian Pietrzykowski
 Girl's Halfpipe winners:   Chloe Kim;   Emily Arthur;   JEONG Yu-rim
 Girl's Slopestyle winners:   Chloe Kim;   Elli Pikkujamsa;   Henna Ikola
 Girl's Snowboard Cross winners:   Manon Petit;   Sophie Hediger;   Caterina Carpano
 Team Snowboard Ski Cross winners:  ;  ;   Mixed-NOCs (Team 4)

Alpine snowboarding
 December 12, 2015: FIS ASB World Cup #1 in  Carezza Dolomites
 Men's Parallel Giant Slalom winner:  Radoslav Yankov
 Women's Parallel Giant Slalom winner:  Ester Ledecká
 December 19, 2015: FIS ASB World Cup #2 in  Cortina d'Ampezzo
 Men's Parallel Slalom winner:  Christoph Mick
 Women's Parallel Slalom winner:  Patrizia Kummer
 January 8 & 9: FIS ASB World Cup #3 in  Bad Gastein
 Men's Parallel Slalom winner:  Radoslav Yankov
 Women's Parallel Slalom winner:  Yekaterina Tudegesheva
 Mixed Team Parallel Slalom winners:  (Sabine Schöffmann, Alexander Payer)
 January 23: FIS ASB World Cup #4 in  Rogla Ski Resort
 Men's Parallel Giant Slalom winner:  Andrey Sobolev
 Women's Parallel Giant Slalom winner:  Ester Ledecká
 January 30: FIS ASB World Cup #5 in  Moscow
 Men's Parallel Slalom winner:  Roland Fischnaller
 Women's Parallel Slalom winner:  Patrizia Kummer
 February 13: FIS ASB World Cup #6 in  Maria Laach am Jauerling
 Events cancelled.
 February 27: FIS ASB World Cup #7 in  Kayseri
 Men's Parallel Giant Slalom winner:  Andreas Prommegger
 Women's Parallel Giant Slalom winner:  Ester Ledecká
 March 6: FIS ASB World Cup #8 (final) in  Winterberg
 Men's Parallel Slalom winner:  Edwin Coratti
 Women's Parallel Slalom winner:  Alena Zavarzina

Snowboard cross
 December 11 – 13, 2015: FIS SBC World Cup #1 in  Montafon
 Men's Snowboard Cross winner:  Alessandro Hämmerle
 Women's Snowboard Cross winner:  Nelly Moenne Loccoz
 Men's Team Snowboard Cross winners:  (Pierre Vaultier, Tony Ramoin)
 Women's Team Snowboard Cross winners:  (Nelly Moenne Loccoz, Chloé Trespeuch)
 December 19, 2015: FIS SBC World Cup #2 in  Cortina d'Ampezzo
 Events cancelled.
 January 22 – 24: FIS SBC World Cup #3 in  Feldberg
 Men's Snowboard Cross #1 winner:  Nikolay Olyunin
 Women's Snowboard Cross #1 winner:  Eva Samková
 Men's Snowboard Cross #2 winner:  Pierre Vaultier
 Women's Snowboard Cross #2 winner:  Nelly Moenne Loccoz
 February 20 & 21: FIS SBC World Cup #4 in  Solnechnaya Dolina (Sunny Valley Ski Resort) near Miass
 Men's Snowboard Cross winner:  Pierre Vaultier
 Women's Snowboard Cross winner:  Eva Samková
 February 25 – 27: FIS SBC World Cup #5 in  Bokwang Phoenix Park (Olympic Test Event for 2018)
 Men's Snowboard Cross winner:  Nate Holland
 Women's Snowboard Cross winner:  Chloé Trespeuch
 March 4 – 6: FIS SBC World Cup #6 in  Veysonnaz
 Men's Snowboard Cross #1 winner:  Baptiste Brochu
 Men's Snowboard Cross #2 winner:  Lucas Eguibar
 Women's Snowboard Cross #1 winner:  Aleksandra Zhekova
 Women's Snowboard Cross #2 winner:  Michela Moioli
 March 10 & 12: FIS SBC World Cup #7 in  Squaw Valley Ski Resort
 Events cancelled.
 March 19 & 20: FIS SBC World Cup #8 (final) in  Baqueira-Beret
 Men's Snowboard Cross winner:  Alex Pullin
 Women's Snowboard Cross winner:  Belle Brockhoff

Freestyle snowboarding
 August 20, 22, 28, and 30, 2015: FIS FSB World Cup #1 in  Cardrona Alpine Resort
 Men's Halfpipe winner:  Raibu Katayama
 Women's Halfpipe winner:  Cai Xuetong
 Men's Slopestyle winner:  Chris Corning
 Women's Slopestyle winner:  Jamie Anderson
 January 21 & 24: FIS FSB World Cup #2 in  Mammoth Mountain Ski Area
 Men's Halfpipe winner:  Ryō Aono
 Women's Halfpipe winner:  Kelly Clark
 Men's Slopestyle winner:  Brandon Davis
 Women's Slopestyle winner:  Anna Gyarmati
 February 4 & 6: FIS FSB World Cup #3 in  Park City Mountain Resort
 Men's Halfpipe winner:  Matthew Ladley
 Women's Halfpipe winner:  Chloe Kim
 February 11: FIS FSB World Cup #4 in  Boston
 Men's Big Air winner:  Maxence Parrot
 Women's Big Air winner:  Julia Marino
 February 12 & 14: FIS FSB World Cup #6 in  Sapporo
 Men's Halfpipe winner:  Ryō Aono
 Women's Halfpipe winner:  Cai Xuetong
 February 13: FIS FSB World Cup #5 in  Quebec City
 Men's Big Air winner:  Maxence Parrot
 Women's Big Air winner:  Jamie Anderson
 February 19 & 21: FIS FSB World Cup #7 in  Bokwang Phoenix Park (Olympic Test Event for 2018)
 Men's Slopestyle winner:  Brock Crouch
 Women's Slopestyle winner:  Jamie Anderson
 March 19 & 20: FIS FSB World Cup #8 (final) in  Špindlerův Mlýn
 Men's Slopestyle winner:  Jamie Nicholls
 Women's Slopestyle winner:  Silvia Mittermueller

FIS Snowboard South American Continental Cup
 August 17 – 19: South American Continental Cup #1 in  Corralco
 Women's snowboard cross winner:  Isabel Clark Ribeiro
 Men's snowboard cross winner:  Franco Ruffini
 Women's snowboard cross winner:  Isabel Clark Ribeiro
 Men's snowboard cross winner:  Hernán Cataldi
 August 31 – September 1: South American Continental Cup #2 in  Antillanca ski resort
 Women's snowboard cross winner:  Isabel Clark Ribeiro
 Men's snowboard cross winner:  Josh Miller
 Women's snowboard cross winner:  Catalina Petersen
 Men's snowboard cross winner:  Tyler Jackson
 September 10 – 12: South American Continental Cup #3 in  El Colorado Ski Resort
 Women's Big Air winner:  Antonia Yañez
 Men's Big Air winner:  Federico Chiaradio
 Men's Big Air winner:  Iñaki Irarrázaval

FIS Snowboard Oceanian Continental Cup
 July 25 & 26: Oceanian Continental Cup #1 in  Cardrona Alpine Resort
 Men's Halfpipe winner:  Freeman Andrews 
 Women's Halfpipe winner:  Emily Arthur
 Men's Slopestyle winner:  Tiarn Collins
 Women's Slopestyle winner:  Zoi Sadowski Synnott
 August 5 – 7: Oceanian Continental Cup #2 in  Mount Hotham
 Women's snowboard cross winner:  Belle Brockhoff
 Men's snowboard cross winner:  Alex Pullin
 Women's snowboard cross winner:  Belle Brockhoff
 Men's snowboard cross winner:  Alex Pullin

FIS Snowboard Europa Cup
 October 15 & 16: Europa Cup #1 in  Landgraaf
 Women's Parallel Slalom winner:  Nadya Ochner
 Men's Parallel Slalom winner:  Alexander Payer
 Women's Parallel Slalom winner:  Nadya Ochner
 Men's Parallel Slalom winner:  Andrey Sobolev
 November 4 & 5: Europa Cup #2 in  Landgraaf
 Men's Slopestyle winner:  Niek van der Velden
 Women's Slopestyle winner:  Silvia Mittermueller
 Men's Slopestyle winner:  Ville Paumola
 Women's Slopestyle winner:  Sofya Fedorova
 November 25 & 26: Europa Cup #3 in  Pitztal
 Women's Snowboardcross winner:  Eva Samková
 Men's Snowboardcross winner:  Hanno Douschan
 Women's Snowboardcross winner:  Maria Ramberger
 Men's Snowboardcross winner:  Hanno Douschan
 November 28: Europa Cup #4 in  Kaunertal
 This stage was cancelled
 December 5 & 6: Europa Cup #5 in  Hochfuegen
 Men's Parallel Giant Slalom #1 winner:  Radoslav Yankov
 Men's Parallel Giant Slalom #2 winner:  Radoslav Yankov
 Women's Parallel Giant Slalom #1 winner:  Selina Jörg
 Women's Parallel Giant Slalom #2 winner:  Selina Jörg
 December 19 & 20: Europa Cup #6 in  Rogla
 This stage was cancelled
 January 15 & 16: Europa Cup #7 in  Davos
 Women's Big Air winner:  Kateřina Vojáčková
 Men's Big Air winner:  Emiliano Lauzi
 January 23 & 24: Europa Cup #8 in  Oberwiesenthal
 This stage was cancelled
 January 26 & 27: Europa Cup #9 in  Vars, Hautes-Alpes
 Women's Slopestyle #1 winner:  Sofya Fedorova
 Women's Slopestyle #2 winner:  Sofya Fedorova
 Men's Slopestyle #1 winner:  Markus Olimstad
 Men's Slopestyle #2 winner:  Stian Kleivdal
 January 28 – 30: Europa Cup #10 in  Stara Planina
 Men's Parallel Slalom winner:  Dmitry Sarsembaev
 Women's Parallel Slalom winner:  Carolin Langenhorst
 Men's Parallel Giant Slalom winner:  Dmitry Sarsembaev
 Women's Parallel Giant Slalom winner:  Anastasia Kurochkina
 January 30 & 31: Europa Cup #11 in  Obermaiselstein–Grasgehren
 Men's Snowboardcross winner:  Tommaso Leoni
 Women's Snowboardcross winner:  Hanna Ihedioha
 February 20 & 21: Europa Cup #12 in  Seiser Alm
 Men's Slopestyle #1 winner:  Loris Framarin
 Men's Slopestyle #2 winner:  Aleix López
 Women's Slopestyle #1 winner:  Kateřina Vojáčková
 Women's Slopestyle #2 winner:  Babs Barnhoorn
 February 20 & 21: Europa Cup #13 in  Lenzerheide
 Men's Parallel Slalom #1 winner:  Edwin Coratti
 Men's Parallel Slalom #2 winner:  Stefan Baumeister
 Women's Parallel Slalom #1 winner:  Sabine Schöffmann
 Women's Parallel Slalom #2 winner:  Sabine Schöffmann
 February 20 & 21: Europa Cup #13 in  Davos
 Men's Halfpipe #1 winner:  Nikita Avtaneev
 Men's Halfpipe #2 winner:  Elias Gian Allenspach
 Women's Halfpipe #1 winner:  Berenice Wicki
 Women's Halfpipe #2 winner:  Ramona Petrig
 February 27 & 28: Europa Cup #14 in  Boží Dar
 This event is cancelled

North American Cup 2015–2016
 November 18 & 19, 2015: North American Cup #1 in  Echo Mountain
 Women's Parallel Slalom #1 winner:  Ester Ledecká
 Women's Parallel Slalom #2 winner:  Julie Zogg
 Men's Parallel Slalom #1 winner:  Nevin Galmarini
 Men's Parallel Slalom #2 winner:  Masaki Shiba
 December 19 & 20, 2015: North American Cup #2 in  Buck Hill
 Women's Parallel Slalom #1 winner:  Katrina Gerencser
 Women's Parallel Slalom #2 winner:  Asa Toyoda
 Men's Parallel Slalom #1 winner:  Yuya Suzuki
 Men's Parallel Slalom #2 winner:  Steven MacCutcheon
 January 16 & 17, 2016: North American Cup #3 in  Howelsen Hill Ski Area
 Men's Parallel Giant Slalom winner:  Robert Burns
 Men's Parallel Slalom winner:  Sébastien Beaulieu
 Women's Parallel Giant Slalom winner:  Jennifer Hawkrigg
 Women's Parallel Slalom winner:  Emma Van Groningen
 January 29 – 31, 2016: North American Cup #4 in  Tabor Mountain Ski Resort #1
 Men's Snowboardcross #1 winner:  Adam Dickson
 Men's Snowboardcross #2 winner:  Cole Johnson
 Women's Snowboardcross #1 winner:  Carle Brenneman
 Women's Snowboardcross #2 winner:  Rosina Mancari
 February 3 – 5, 2016: North American Cup #5 in  Tabor Mountain Ski Resort #2
 Men's Snowboardcross #1 winner:  Adam Dickson
 Men's Snowboardcross #2 winner:  Adam Dickson
 Women's Snowboardcross #1 winner:  Carle Brenneman
 Women's Snowboardcross #2 winner:  Meryeta O'Dine
 February 16 – 21, 2016: North American Cup #6 in  Ski Cooper 
 Men's Snowboardcross #1 winner:  Hagen Kearney
 Men's Snowboardcross #2 winner:  Adam Dickson
 Men's Snowboardcross #3 winner:  Devryn Valley
 Women's Snowboardcross #1 winner:  Lindsey Jacobellis
 Women's Snowboardcross #2 winner:  Rosina Mancari
 Women's Snowboardcross #3 winner:  Ellise Turner
 February 17 & 18, 2016: North American Cup #7 in  Toronto Ski Club
 Men's Parallel Giant Slalom #1 winner:  Kim Sang-kyum
 Men's Parallel Giant Slalom #2 winner:  Kim Sang-kyum
 Women's Parallel Giant Slalom #1 winner:  Megan Farrell
 Women's Parallel Giant Slalom #2 winner:  Megan Farrell
 February 22 & 23, 2016: North American Cup #8 in  Holiday Valley
 Men's Parallel Giant Slalom #1 winner:  Sebastien Beaulieu
 Men's Parallel Giant Slalom #2 winner:  Sebastien Beaulieu
 Women's Parallel Giant Slalom #1 winner:  Megan Farrell
 Women's Parallel Giant Slalom #2 winner:  Megan Farrell
 February 27 & 28, 2016: North American Cup #9 in  Le Relais
 Men's Parallel Giant Slalom #1 winner:  Jasey-Jay Anderson
 Men's Parallel Giant Slalom #2 winner:  Kim Sang-kyum
 Women's Parallel Giant Slalom #1 winner:  Megan Farrell
 Women's Parallel Giant Slalom #2 winner:  Megan Farrell
 February 29 – March 4, 2016: North American Cup #10 in  Sugarloaf
 March 16 & 17, 2016: North American Cup #11 in  Squaw Valley Ski Resort
 March 21 – 26, 2016: North American Cup #12 in  Ski Chantecler
 April 3 – 5, 2016: North American Cup #13 (final) in  Copper Mountain

2015–16 IPC Snowboarding World Cup
 November 19 & 20, 2015: IPC SB World Cup #1 in  Landgraaf
 For Men's Bank Slalom #1 results, click here.

 For Women's Bank Slalom #1 results, click here.

 For Men's Bank Slalom #2 results, click here.

 For Women's Bank Slalom #2 results, click here.

 February 5 & 6: IPC SB World Cup #2 in  Aspen/Snowmass
 For the Men's and Women's Snowboard Cross results, click here.
 February 10 – 13: IPC SB World Cup #3 in  Big White Ski Resort
 For the Snowboard Cross and the Banked Slalom results, click here.
 March 5 & 6: IPC SB World Cup #4 in  La Molina
 Events cancelled.
 March 9 – 12: IPC SB World Cup #5 in  Les Angles, Pyrénées-Orientales
 For the banked slalom results, click here.
 March 15 & 16: IPC SB World Cup #6 in  Trentino (Predazzo)
 For snowboard cross results, click here.
 March 17 & 18: IPC SB World Cup #7 (final) in  Trentino
 For snowboard cross and banked slalom results, click here.

References

External links
 International Ski Federation official website
 IPC Alpine Skiing official website
 International Biathlon Union official website
 IPC Biathlon and Cross Country Skiing official website
 IPC Snowboard official website

Skiing by year
Skiing
Skiing